= National Museum of Serbia =

Largest museum in Belgrade, Serbia

- Народни музеј Србије; Narodni muzej Srbije

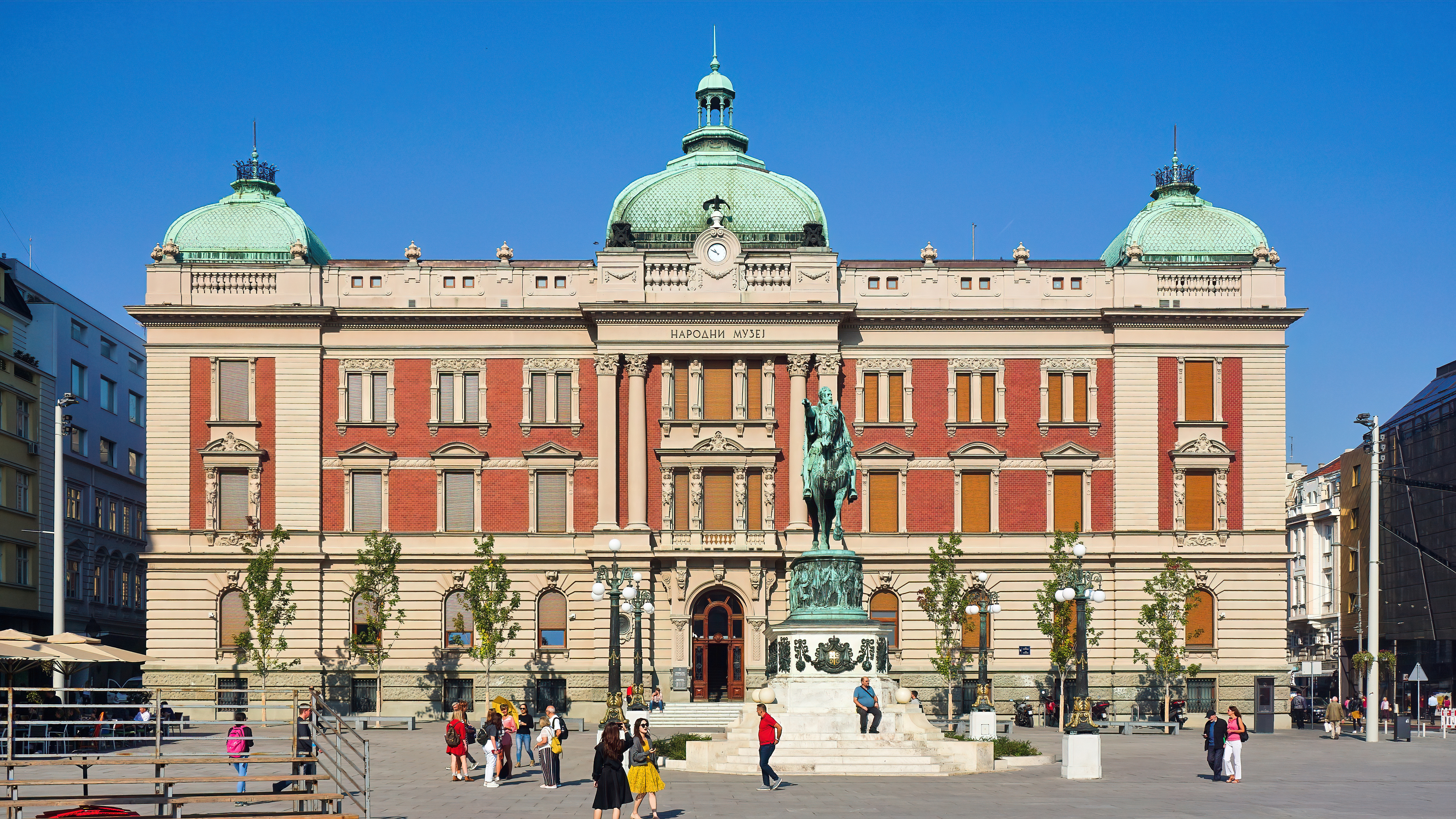
- Front façade of the National Museum of Serbia
- Interactive fullscreen map
- Established: 10 May 1844; 182 years ago
- Location: Belgrade, Serbia
- Coordinates: 44.8167°N 20.4594°E
- Type: Art museum Design museum National History Museum
- Collection size: 400,000+ objects
- Directors: Bojana Borić Brešković (2012–present)
- Website: narodnimuzej.rs

The National Museum of Serbia (Serbian: Народни музеј Србије / Narodni muzej Srbije) is the largest and oldest museum in Belgrade, Serbia. It is located in the central zone of Belgrade on a square plot between the Republic Square, formerly Theatre Square, and three streets: Čika Ljubina, Vasina and Laze Pačua. Its main facade is on the Republic Square and the official address is 1a Republic Square.

The museum was established on 10 May 1844. It moved into the present building in 1950, with the grand opening of the venue on 23 May 1952. Since its founding, the museum's collection has grown to over 400,000 objects, including many foreign masterpieces.

The National Museum of Serbia building was declared a Monument of Culture of Great Importance in 1979.

== History ==
Before the erection of the building of the National Museum on this place was a famous tavern called "Dardanelles", meeting point of the cultural and artistic elite of the time. The tavern's demolition signified the beginning of the transformation of The Republic Square. The building which housed the museum originally was built from 1902 to 1903, for the purpose of the Uprava Fondova, the oldest financial institution in Belgrade. The building was constructed according to the design of architects Andra Stevanović and Nikola Nestorović after a competition on which they received the first prize. It was one of the first buildings in which was used some form of reinforced concrete for the foundation. During the digging of foundation trenches, the various pits, wells and basements were encountered because of the proximity of the former Stambol Gate. The newly built two-storeyed building's volume conception designed in the form of a long solid block with domes over the central and lateral Rizal sites and academic façade shape was based on the principles of neo-Renaissance style with neo-baroque elements on the domes. The greatest attention was given to the monumental staircase and the hall with bank windows which as the basic premises of a bank was given secondary importance. In the 1930s, the increased development of the State Mortgage Bank of Yugoslavia (Serbian: Državna hipotekarna banka), the successor entity to Uprava Fondova, generated a need for a reconstruction of the building. The extension was made without competition by architect Vojin Petrović, who designed the added wing and atrium facing the street Laze Paču. The new part of the building contained the same elements of interior as the old part, and in the final image, the building received two monumental staircases and two halls with bank windows while only the upper floors form the continuous line of offices. During World War II, the Mortgage Bank building was bombed and the central part with the dome was destroyed. After the war, the building was purpose when the museum moved in.

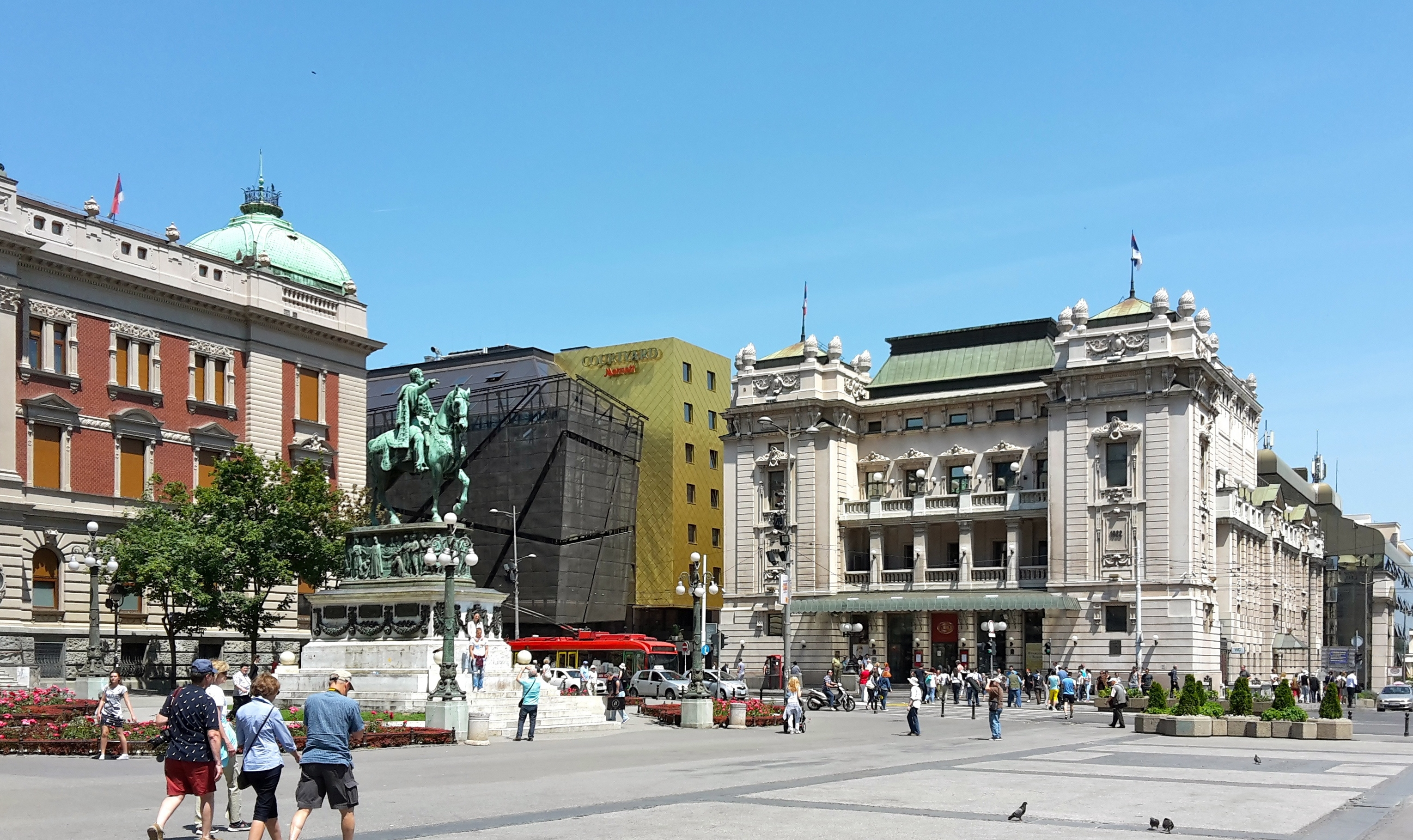
Republic Square, Left: National Museum of Serbia – Centre: Hotel Marriott Belgrade – Right: National Theatre.

Since its establishment during the Constitutionalist era, the National Museum changed location several times. At a beginning, it was placed in Captain Miša's building (1863) and soon after it was moved into two adjacent buildings which were destroyed during World War I. At the same time, the museum's art collections were seized and looted by invaders. During the interwar period, the museum did not have its own building. The museum was located in a rented private house at 58 Kneza Miloša street. In 1935 the New Royal Palacе became the residence of the museum and named the Royal Museum. Subsequently, it was renamed into the Museum of Prince Paul which consisted of Historical Museum and the Museum of Contemporary Art (founded in 1929), which merged in 1935.

The museum avoided destruction during the initial Nazi bombing of Belgrade in April 1941. Professor and major Johann von Reiswitz noted this in his 1941 report. He was head of the Referat for the Protection of the Cultural Values in Serbia, a local offshoot of the German Kunstschutz. Von Reiswitz inspected the museum, noting that 100,000 exhibits are preserved, except for some items which went missing in the initial stage of the war: some one hundred coins, eight archaeological artefacts, and two paintings "without greater value".

In 1948 the New Palace was restored and became the administrative seat of government. For that purpose, the museum was transferred into a building of the former Stock Exchange on Student Square, and partly to the Palace of Princess Ljubica. The first architectural competition for the proper National Museum building planned to be on Tašmajdan was announced the following year.

The author of the design was an architect Miladin Prljevic but the Cominform disapproved of this idea. Then the museum was transferred into the building of Mortgage Bank. After World War II, the first renovation of the bank building was done by architect Dobroslav Pavlovic in 1950 but the overall reconstruction of the building was made 1965–1966 by architects Aleksandar Deroko, Petar Anagnosti and Zoran Petrović. The central dome was restored and the central tract with offices and workspaces was lifted. After an adaptation, the original hall with bank windows was converted into a library. The originally main and monumental three-way staircase entrance from Republic Square received an internal character while the other entrance from Vasina street became the main entrance to the museum, which is connected directly to the other hall with bank windows. In a functional arrangement, the building underwent upgrading doubling space and communications, while in terms of design, maintained the characteristic elements of 1902 and in terms of art as an integral unity. Interior renovation from the 1960s was done in such a manner that it is not visible from the outside and it does not disturb the communications inside the museum.

=== 2003–2018 reconstruction ===
In 2003, the permanent exhibition was dismantled and the building was closed for reconstruction, but the process dragged on for years, including gaps when nothing was done at all, and by January 2018 the museum was still not open.

On 25 January 2012, after ten years of the National Museum being closed to the public, Vladimir Bogdanović of the leading Serbian media outlet Press wrote an article called A decade of cultural genocide against the Serbs, commenting on the need and importance of a working national museum. He also criticized the preservation of the art in the museum. The façade was finished in 2015 and had to be reconstructed to its original look as the building is under state protection. In mid-2016 the works on the interiors began. The entrance into the museum from the Vasina Street remained the main entry point, while the exit doors that lead to the Square of the Republic, with its architectural staircase, were adapted as the exit point.

The new permanent exhibit represented the cultural development in this part of Europe from prehistory to the 20th century, with an emphasis on the Serbian cultural heritage. The 18th and 19th centuries art was exhibited on the first floor, along with the 20th-century Yugoslav art. In the atrium of the building, there are vaults, left from the period when the venue served as a bank, which were adapted into the exhibition depots. The look of the vault was preserved and utilized for the presentation of the museum numismatic collection, from the beginning of the coin minting to the 20th century. In addition, a collection of the medallion art was also exhibited there.

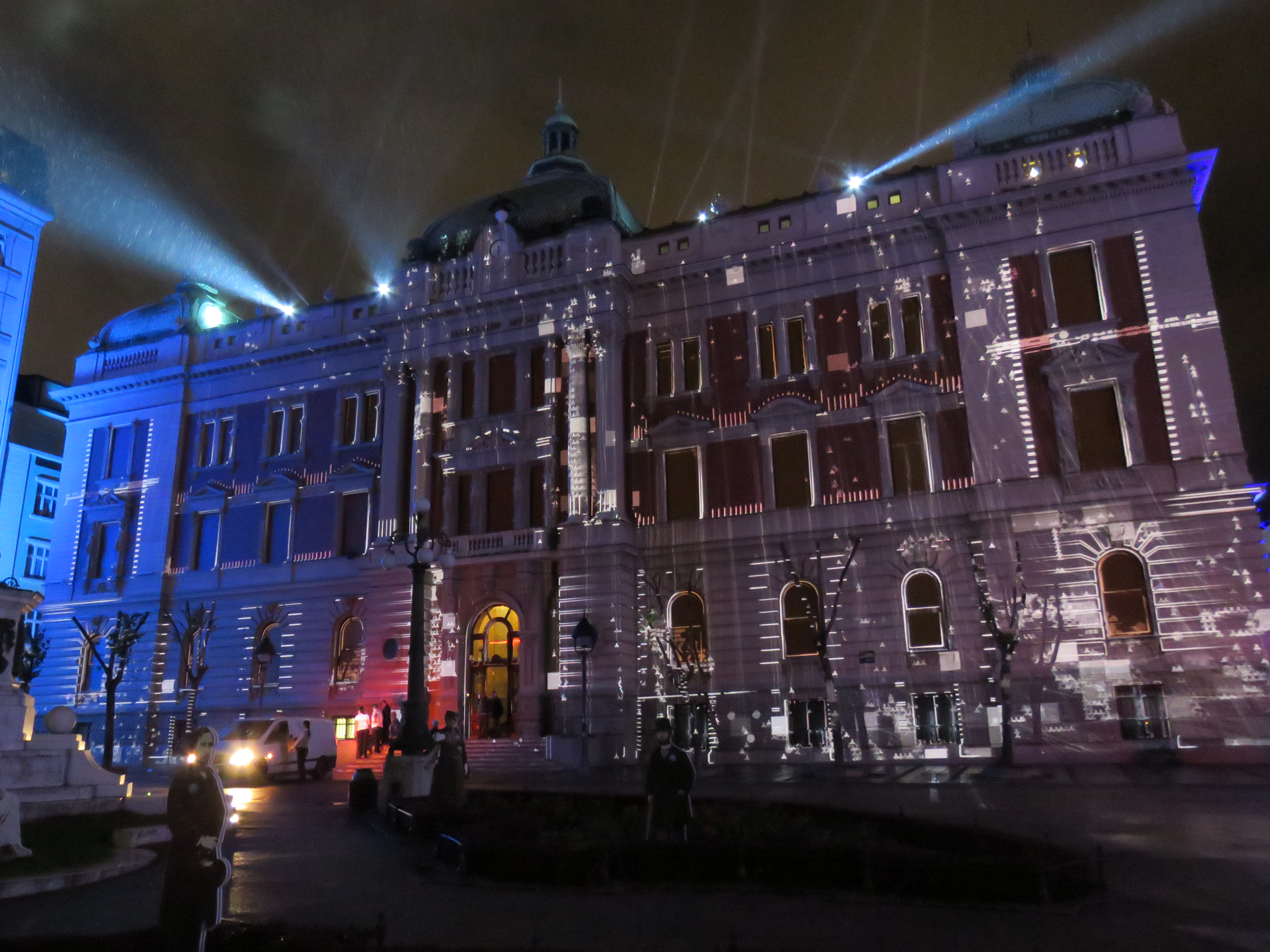
National Museum re-opening ceremony on 28 June 2018 following a renovation that lasted over a decade.

The construction works should be finished by March 2018, when the preparation and setting of the collections should start.

On 18 June 2018, 10 days before the scheduled opening, reporters from the daily Politika visited the museum. They reported that the venue does not look like something to be open in several days, and the employees confirmed that it would take at least six more months to complete everything, but that the museum will be open as scheduled. The reporters were not allowed to photograph everything. Even though the reconstruction projects, by architects Milan Rakočević and Vladimir Lojanica, envisioned several major changes (including the reconstruction of the glass roof and a dome destroyed during the heavy 1944 Allied Easter bombing of Belgrade), nothing was actually changed so after 15 years the building wasn't thoroughly reconstructed as announced, but only refurbished. This way the capacity of the exhibition space wasn't enlarged, so the permanent exhibition will have 3,000 pieces, out of 400,000.

The large mural by Mladen Josić, painted in the 1930s and located on the wall of the mezzanine, was preserved. Josić painted another mural, close to the former dome, but was destroyed in the 1944 bombing. One of the remnants of the 1966 reconstruction, when the museum was managed by Lazar Trifunović, is a window decorated with the wrought iron. The window was originally facing outside until 1933 when the annex was added to the building.

=== Re-opening and name change ===
The National Museum in Belgrade was officially re-opened on 28 June 2018. The grand re-opening ceremony included projections on the building's facade, as well as a promotional video featuring famous Ukrainian ballet dancer Sergei Polunin.

The National Museum in Belgrade was renamed as the National Museum of Serbia on 8 April 2021.

=== Current status ===
The National Museum of Serbia is a representative public building, monumental in size and volume, as well as its external shape and style. That is especially visible in the entrance area with twin columns and magnificent dome. All the facades characterized by polychrome ornaments neo-Renaissance origin. Monumentality is also reflected in the interior with rich decoration done by famous artists of the time: Andrea Domenico (also known as a painter of decorative wall painting that is in the interior of the building of the Old Palace), Franz Valdman and Bora Kovacevic.

== Collections ==
The museum has 34 archeological, numismatic, artistic and historical collections.

=== Archeological collections ===
The main collection consists of sculptures from Vinča (6th–5th millennium BC) such as Lady of Vinča and Lepenski Vir (7th millennium BC). There are also numerous sculptures, weapons, helmets and other items from ancient Rome, 1005 items from ancient Greece and various items of Celtic origin. The most valuable pieces from that period are Dupljaja Chariot (16th–13th century BC), golden masks from Trebeništa (6th century BC), household sets from Jabučje (1st century AD), the Belgrade Cameo (4th century) and a Silver belt with swastika (5th century BC). There is also a collection from ancient Egypt. The most famous piece is a rare gold sarcophagus and mummy of the Egyptian priest Nesmin.

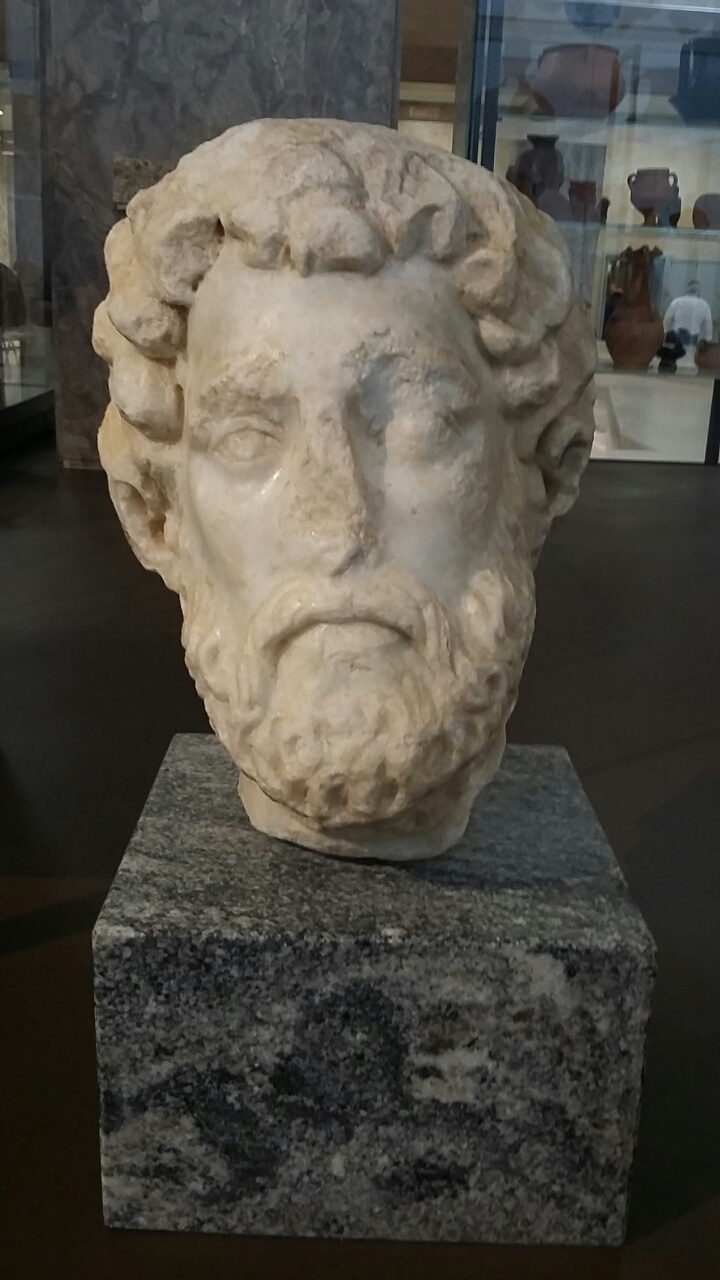
Bust of Marcus Aurelius

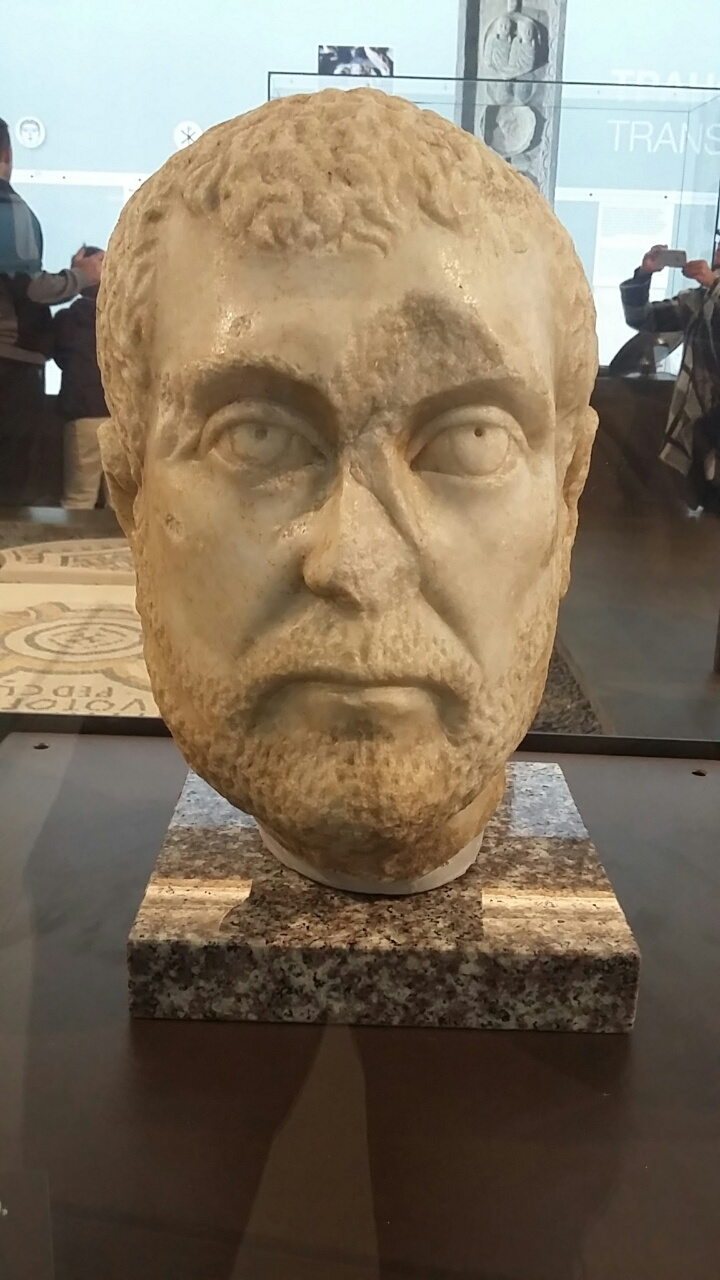
Bust of Diocletian

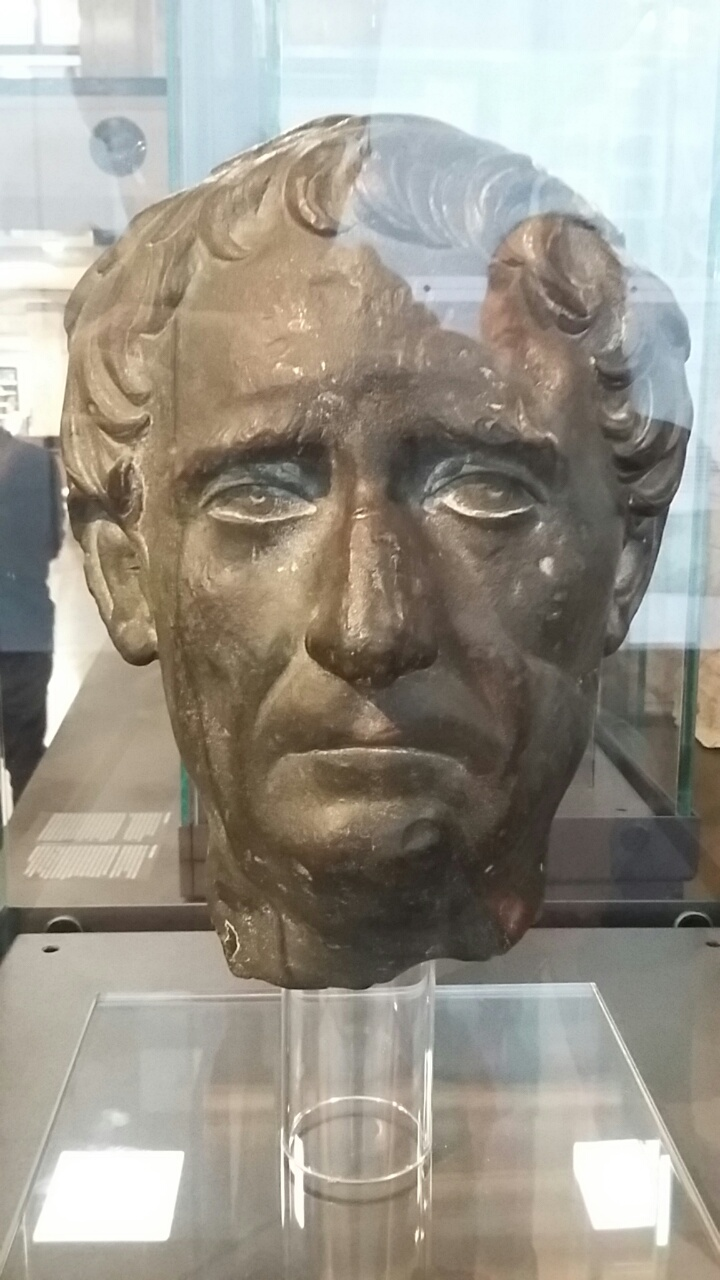
Bust of Marcus Ulpius Traianus

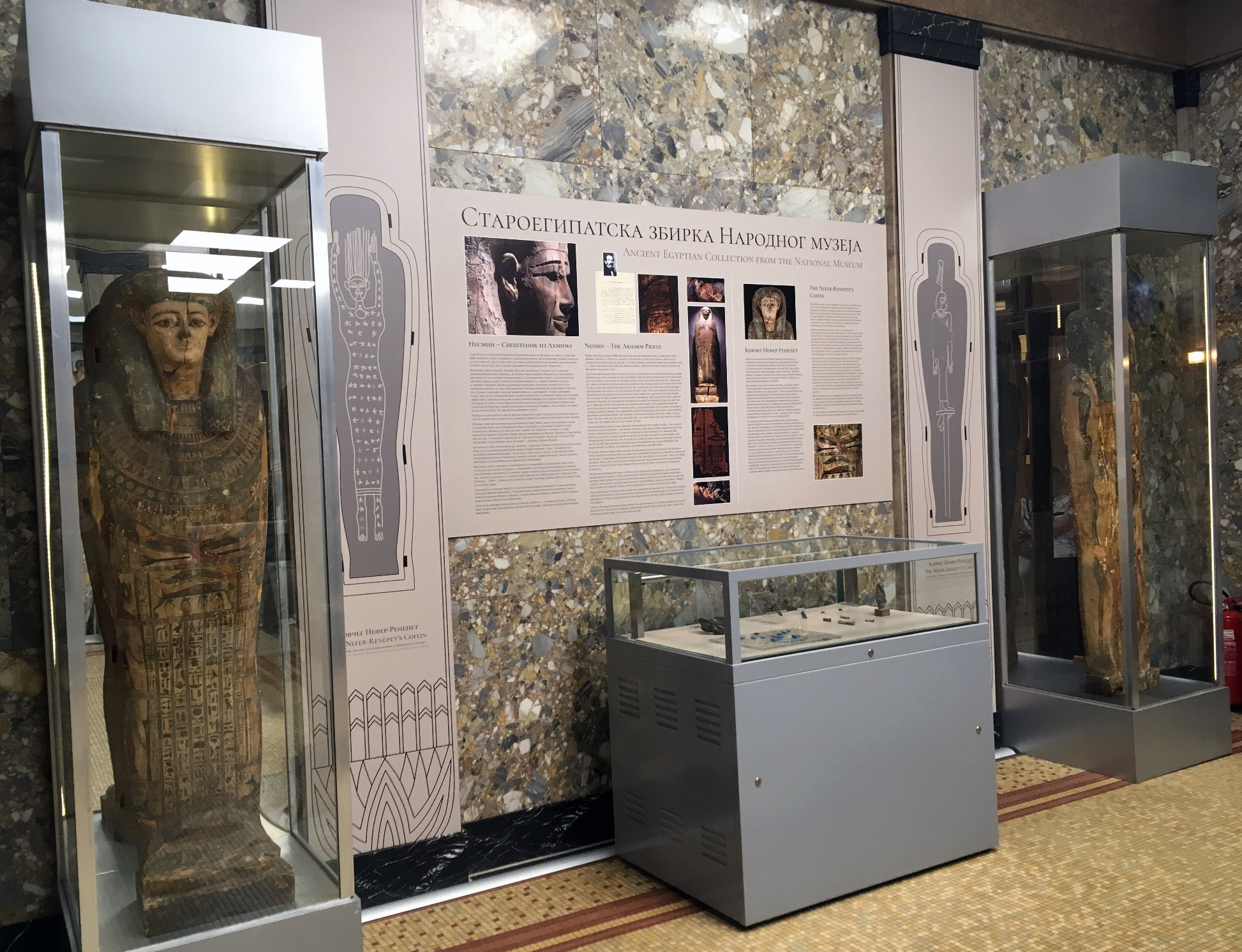
Nesmin (also known as The Belgrade Mummy) from the Ptolemaic Period

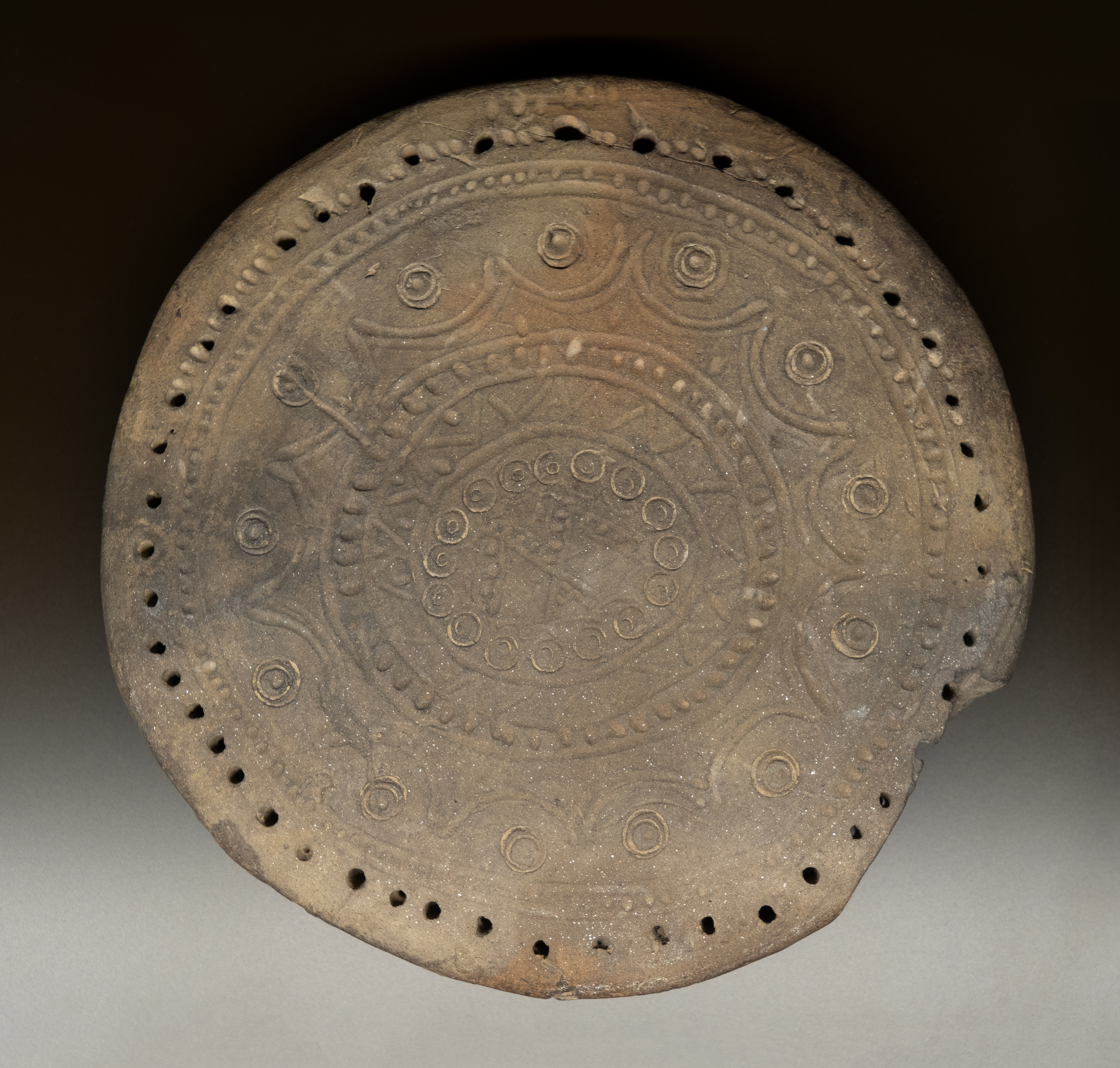
Lid from Bronze Age (2nd millennium B.C., Vojlovica excavation)

=== Numismatics ===
The Numismatic Collection has more than 300,000 items (coins, medals, rings, seals). The collection is divided into ten smaller assemblies from 6th–5th century BC, and includes a collection of coins issued by Philip II of Macedon (359–336 BC) and Alexander the Great (336–323 BC). The collection also contains unique items: a golden medallion of Emperor Valentinian I, minted 364 AD, silver Dinars from the reign of King Stefan Radoslav of Serbia, and others.

=== Medieval collection ===
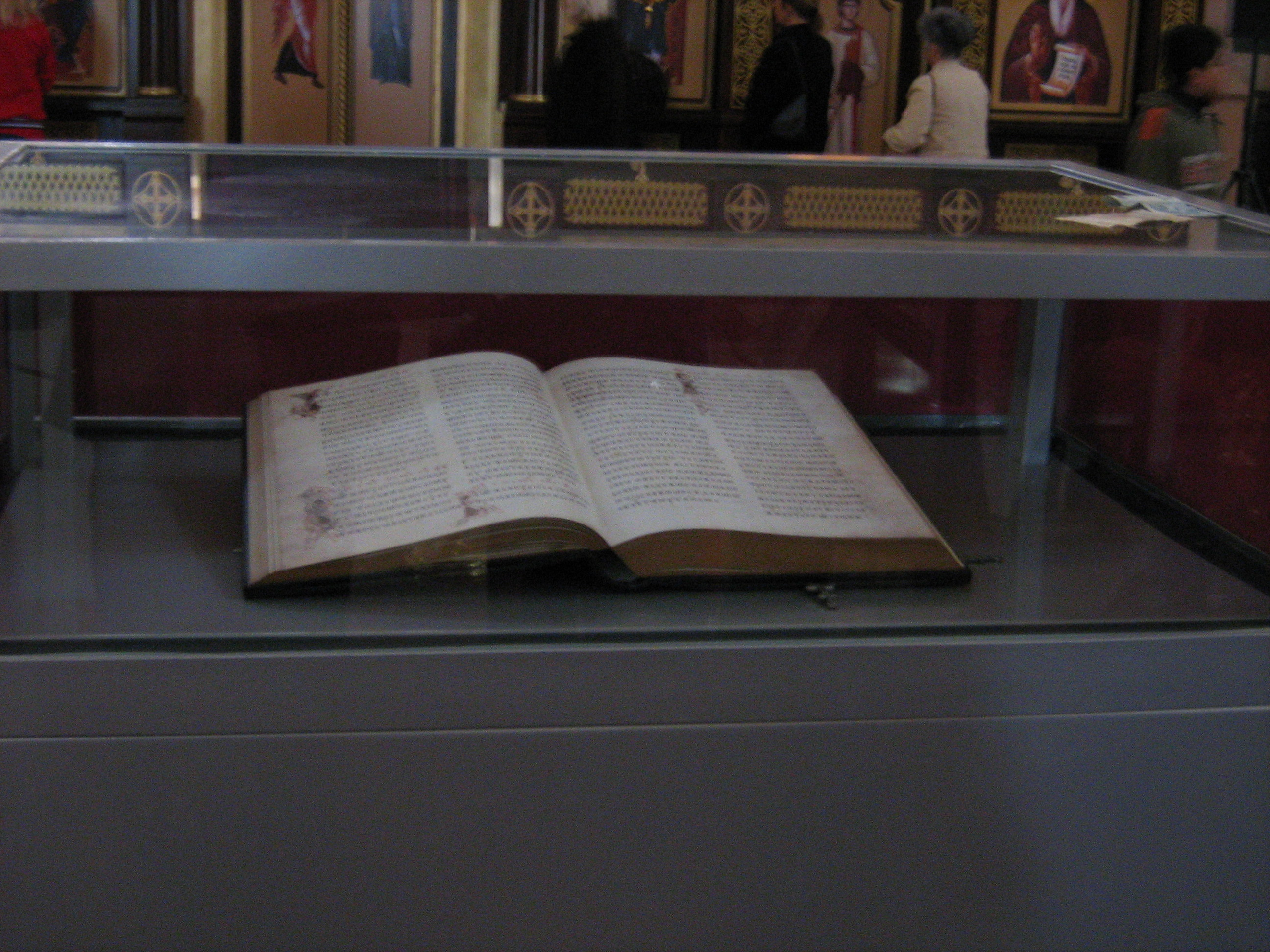
Miroslav Gospels part of UNESCO's Memory of the World

The museum also holds a large collection of medieval artifacts, mostly from Europe and Asia. The most important is the illustrated 362 page manuscript of the Miroslav Gospels written in 1186 in the Kingdom of Serbia. The manuscript was entered into UNESCO's Memory of the World Register in recognition of its historical value. The collection also includes the sarcophagus of Saint King Stefan Decanski from the 14th century, rings belonging to the Serbian Queen Theodora (before 1322) and King Stephen Radoslav of Serbia (1219–20), King Milutin's mantle from the 1300s, the Eulogy to Prince Lazar – Euphemia's famous embroidery from 1402, about 120 icons from 1200 to 1500, including the Ohrid collection.

=== Art collection ===
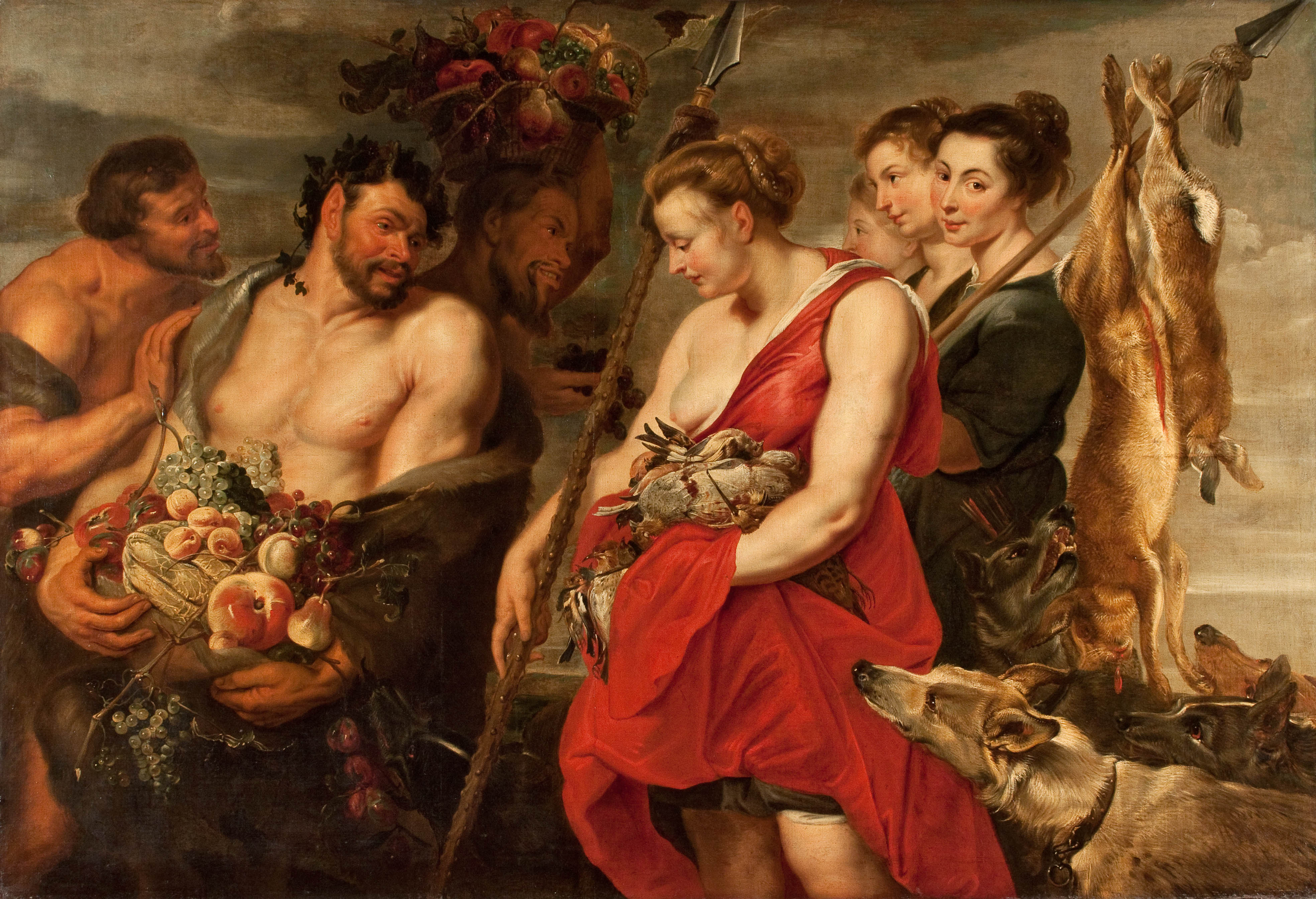
Diana Presenting the Catch to Pan by Peter Paul Rubens and Frans Snyders, oil on canvas 1615, W: 211.5 cm (83.3 in). H: 145 cm (57.1 in).

The Collection of Drawings and Prints of International Artists has 2,446 items and the Yugoslav Art Collection has more than 6,000 items, including 1,700 paintings of Serbian authors from 18th to 19th century and 3,000 paintings from the 20th century. This does not include the Serbian Medieval Art Collection. The museum includes Serbian medieval, French, Dutch, Flemish, Italian, Russian, German, Japanese, Chinese (from 1644 to 1978), English, Spanish, Hungarian, Romanian, Bulgarian, Yugoslav and miscellaneous art collections. In total the collection numbers some 16,000 paintings, graphics, drawings, icons and prints, plus over 900 sculptures.

The French masters collection is the National Museum's most significant holding. It comprises extremely rare pieces from Matisse, Picasso, Renoir, Rouault, Degas, Cézanne and others. Most of these paintings were collected and donated by Prince Paul of Yugoslavia. Erih Šlomović, a young Belgrader born at the turn of the 20th century, became in his youth the protégé of the world's biggest art merchant, Ambroise Vollard. The connection led him to develop his own collection, comprising a total of 600 pieces by 1941. The Šlomović Collection is the largest and richest collection of French art in the Balkans, as well as one of the most beautiful in the world.

==== Italian art collection ====
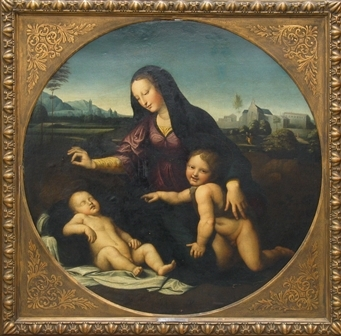
Madonna with Christ and small St. John, attributed to Raphael and Gianfrancesco Penni

Holy Pilgrim and St. Sebastien by Vittore Carpaccio (1495)

The Italian Art Collection, consisting of more than 230 works of art, is famous for containing creative works from individual masters and artistic workshops from the 14th to the 20th century. They include works by Domenico Veneziano, Giovanni di Paolo, Raphael, Titian, Tintoretto, Domenico Robusti, Vittore Carpaccio, Lorenzo di Credi, Guido Reni, Spinello Aretino, Francesco Bassano the Younger, Leandro Bassano, Giovanni Battista Tiepolo, Canaletto, Francesco Guardi, Giulio Carpioni, Andrea Celesti, Biagio Faggioni etc. The graphic and etching collection includes work by Botticelli, Annibale Carracci, Giovanni Battista Piranesi, Paolo Veronese, Amedeo Modigliani, Luigi Ontani, Guglielmo Achille Cavellini, Giuseppe Pinot-Gallizio, and others.

Highlights in the museum include:

- Paolo Veneziano, Madonna and Child (Tempera on panel, c. 1324),
- Paolo di Giovanni Fei, Madonna with Christ on the Throne (triptych 48 x 45 cm c.1390)
- Lorenzo Veneziano, Nativité (Tempera – 76.3 x 54.8 cm)
- Giovanni Di Paolo, Lord and Three Angels (tempera 54 x 27 cm)
- Raphael attribution, Madonna with Christ and small St.John, 114x116 cm
- Andrea Solari, Christ Ecce Hommo
- Lorenzo di Credi, Adoration (d: 96 cm – tempera, c. 1500)
- Vittore Carpaccio, Holy Pilgrim (110x37cm-part of polyptych) and St. Sebastian (108 x 36 cm – 1495 – part of polyptych)
- Titian, Nicolas Vicarius Portrait (canvas 200x100cm), Portrait of Catherine of Austria (Oil on canvas – 110 x 83 cm)
- Tintoretto, Madonna and Child with Donor (oil on canvas, d: 158 cm, 1524)
- Leonello Spada, Judith and Halophen (canvas 220x150 cm)
- Domenico Robusti, Portrait of Venetian (canvas 200x127cm)
- Giovanni Battista Tiepolo, Saint Family, Collecting Mana attributed (oil on canvas)
- Canaletto, Grand Canal with Santa Maria della Salute (oil on canvas 60 x 95 cm)
- Francesco Guardi, Plaza San Marco, Venice (oil on canvas 75 x 99 cm −1765)
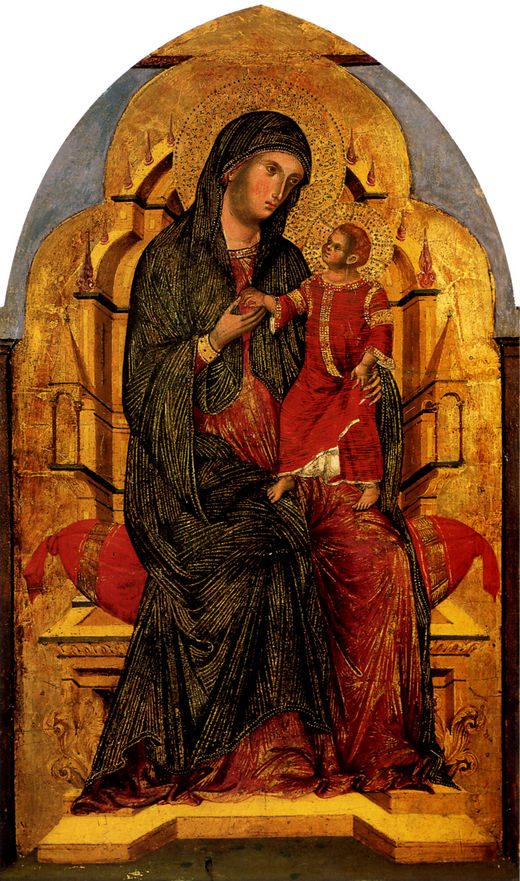
Madonna and Child, by Paolo Veneziano, (c.1355)

Nativite, by Lorenzo Veneziano, (c. 1360)

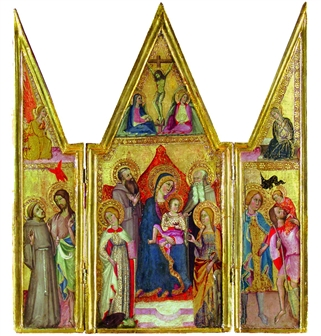
Madonna with Christ on the Throne, by Paolo di Giovanni Fei (1390)

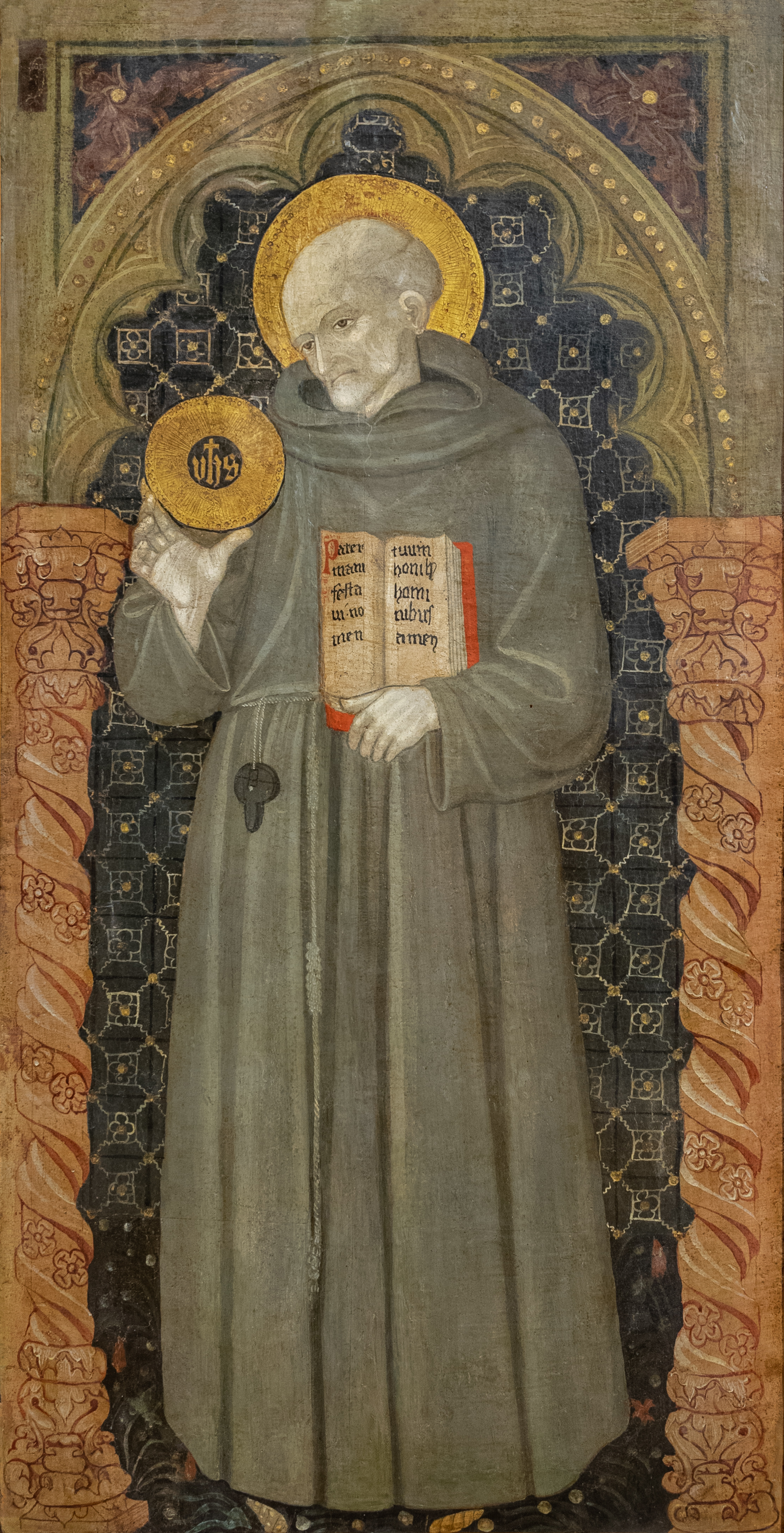
Saint Bernardino of Siena (15. century) attributed to Sassetta

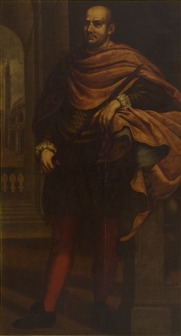
Nicolas Vicarius Portrait, by Titian (1540)

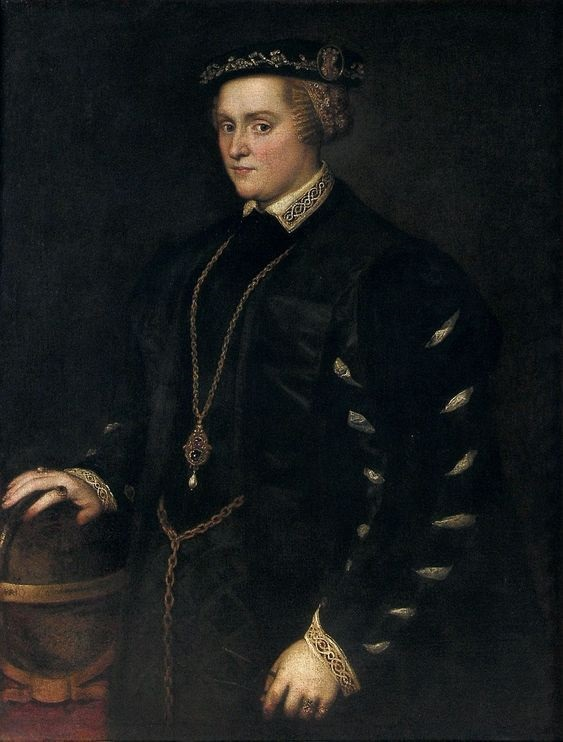
Portrait of Queen Christina of Denmark by Titian (1556)

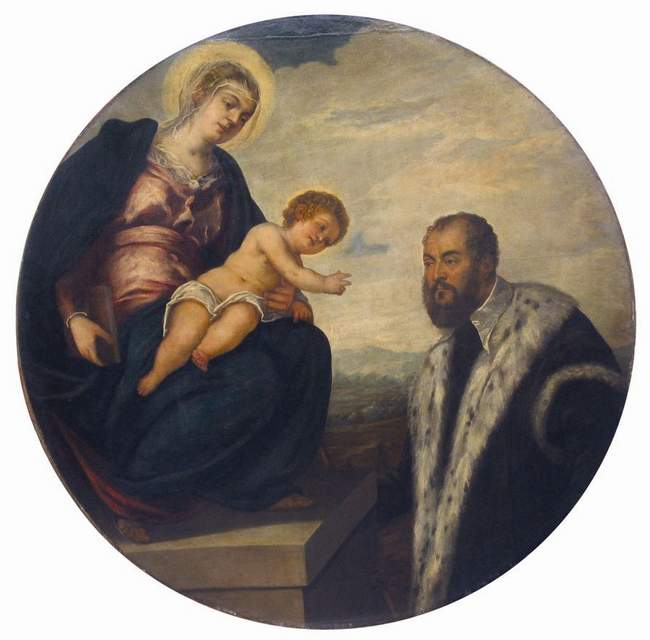
Madonna and Child, by Tintoretto

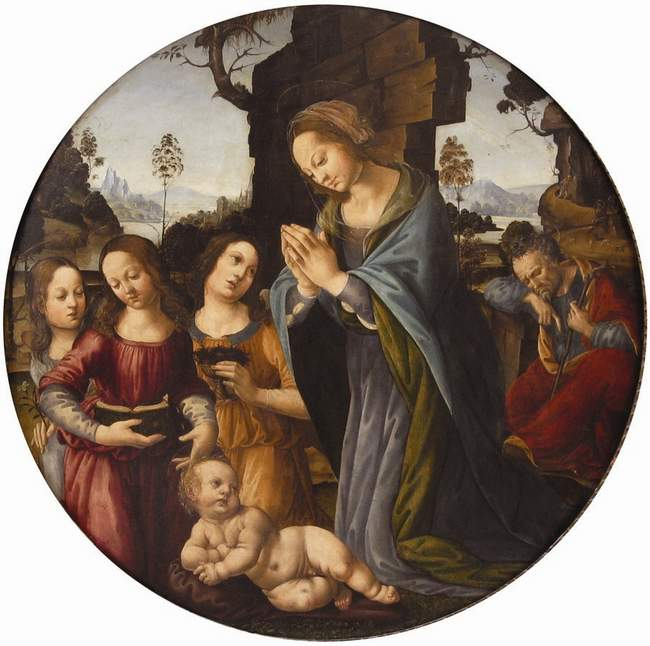
Adoration, by Lorenzo di Credi

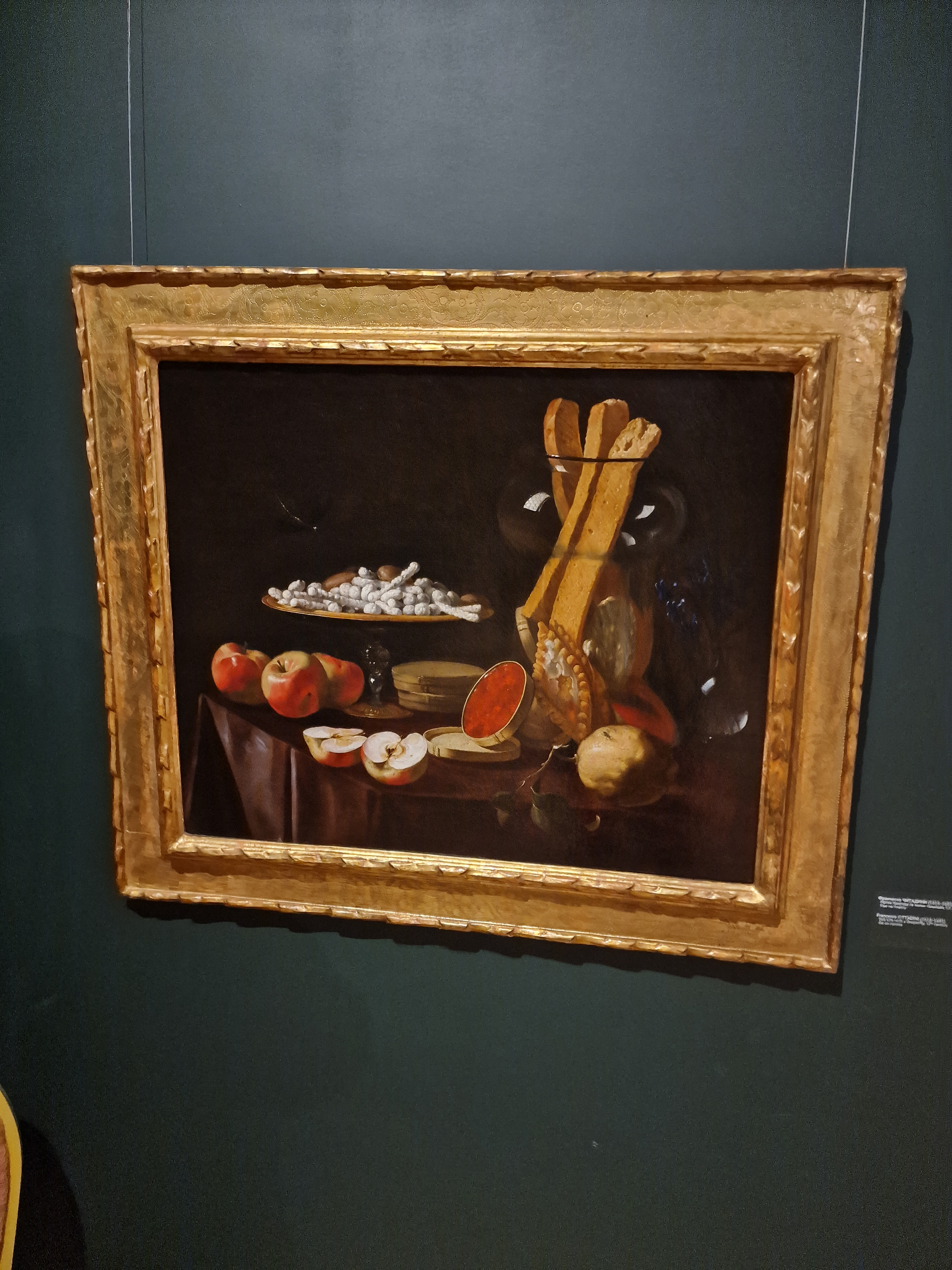
Still life with the dragonfly, by Pierfrancesco Cittadini

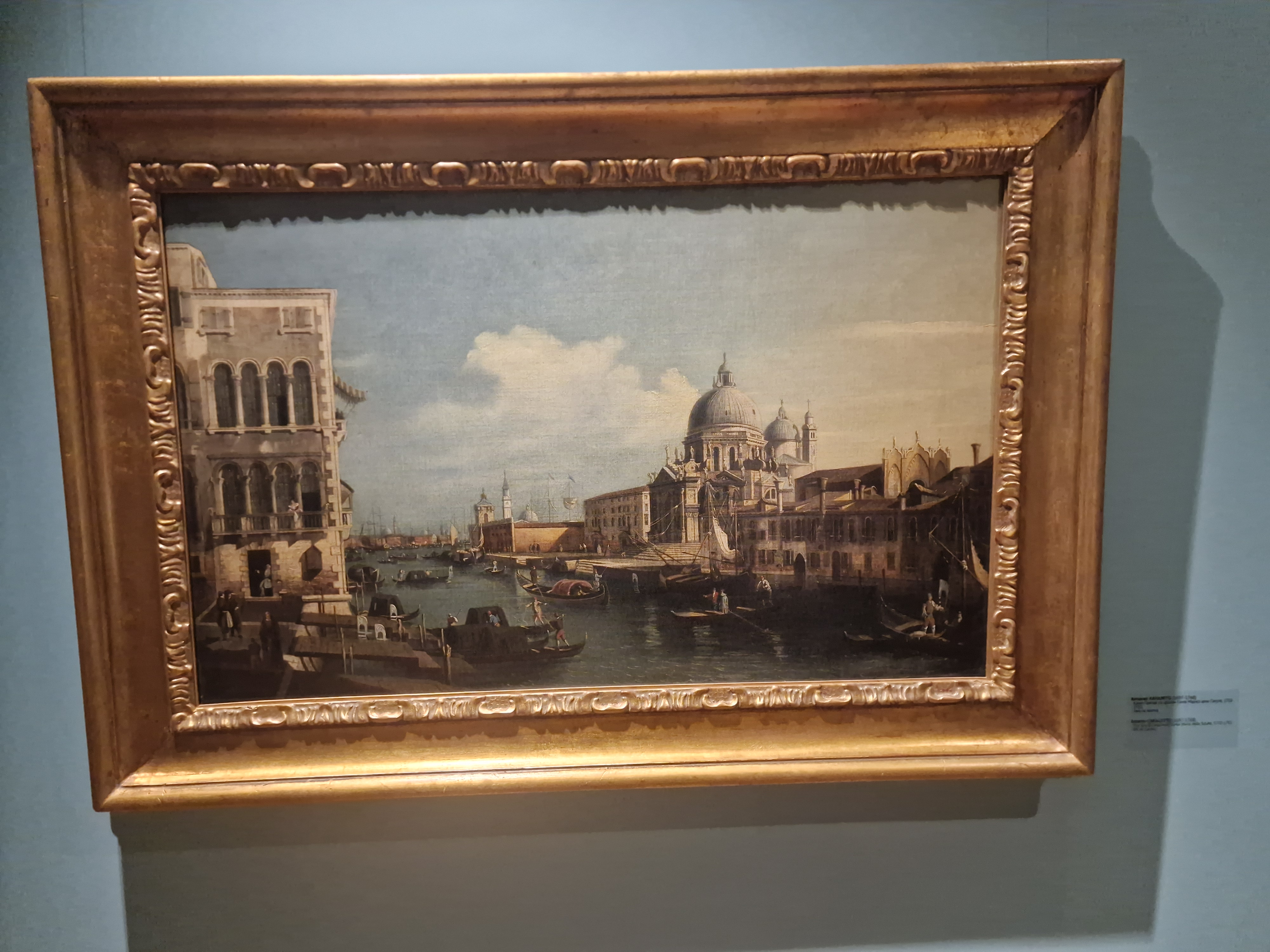
The grand canal with Santa Maria della Salute, by Canaletto

==== Dutch and Flemish collection ====
Saint John the Baptist Sermon, by Juan de Flandes

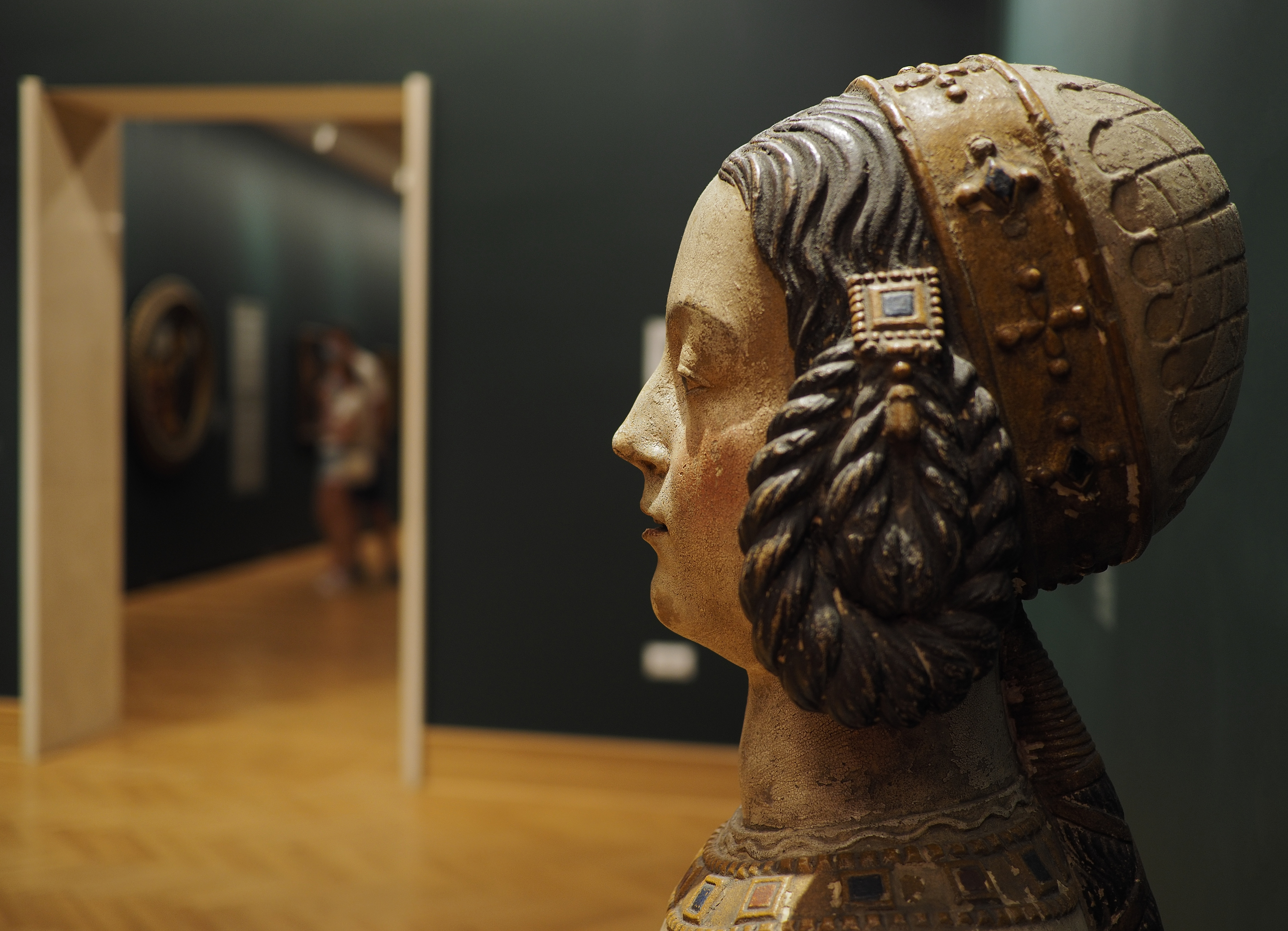
Mary of Burgundy (15–16. century, unknown author)

The Dutch and Flemish collection consists of more than 500 works (210 paintings of art and 220 graphics and engravings, and over 80 drawings). The National Museum in Belgrade was the first museum in the world to include a Piet Mondrian painting in its permanent display. Represented artists include Juan de Flandes, Hieronymus Bosch, Cornelis de Vos, Anthony van Dyck, Antonis Mor, Jan Brueghel the Elder, Marten de Vos, Joos van Cleve, Jan Antonisz. van Ravesteyn, Rubens, Jan van Goyen, Justus Sustermans, Simon de Vos, Jan Victors, Willem van Aelst, Frans van Mieris, Sr., Paulus Potter, Caspar Netscher, Jan Frans van Bloemen, Adam Frans van der Meulen, Godfried Schalcken, Adriaen van Utrecht, Johan Jongkind, Kees van Dongen, Anton Mauve, Allart van Everdingen, Vincent van Gogh and Piet Mondrian.

Highlights in the museum include:

- Juan de Flandes, Saint John the Baptist Sermon, (oil on wood, c. 1497, 80×52 cm)
- Hieronymus Bosch, The Temptation of Saint Anthony, (tempera on panel, 52x×39 cm)
- Joos van Cleve, Portrait of a man with the rosary, (oil on panel, 58×41 cm)
- Antonis Mor, Portrait of Spanish Nobleman (oil on canvas, 130x105cm)
- Marten de Vos, Paradise (oil on panel, 160 x 205 cm),
- Peter Paul Rubens, Diana gifts catch to Pan (oil on canvas, 145×211.5 cm, c.1615)
- Jan Brueghel the Elder, Flowers (oil on canvas 66×50 cm, 1616)
- Cornelis de Vos, Portrait of Young Girl
- Frans van Mieris, Sr., The Music Lesson (oil on panel, 35×29 cm)
- Jan van Goyen, Landscape (oil on panel, 47×67 cm)
- Adriaen van der Werff, Flute Lessons
- Vincent van Gogh, Peasant Woman Standing Indoors (oil on panel, 42×28 cm)
- Kees van Dongen, Portrait of Lady Mini Monne
- Piet Mondrian, Composition II (oil on canvas, 45×45 cm)
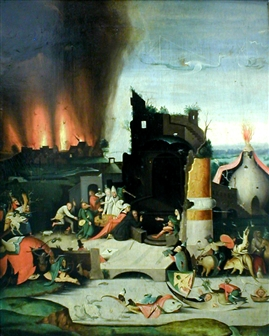
The Temptation of Saint Anthony, by Hieronymus Bosch

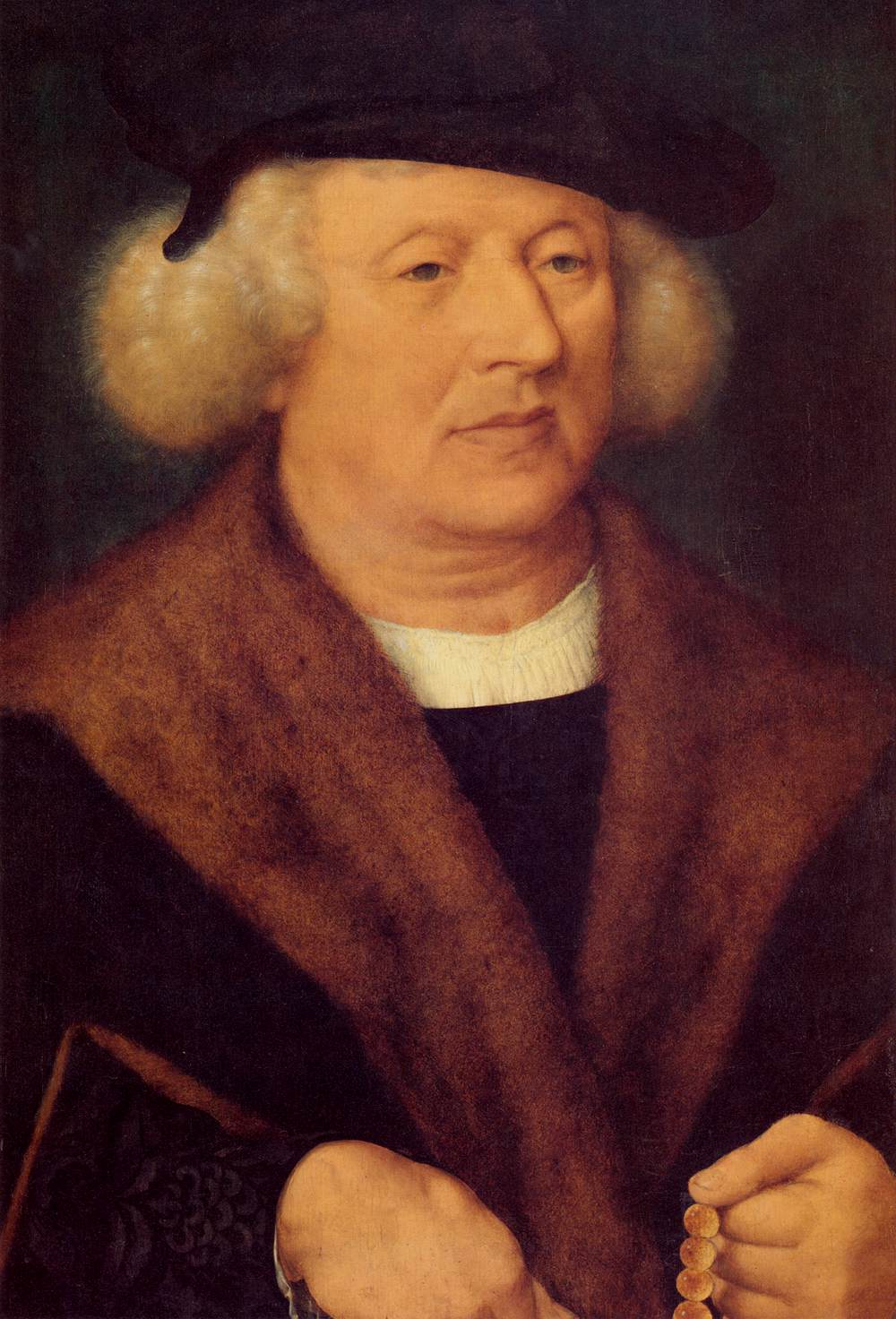
Portrait of a man with the rosary, by Joos van Cleve (c. 1520)

Portrait of Spanish Nobleman, by Antonis Mor (c.1555)

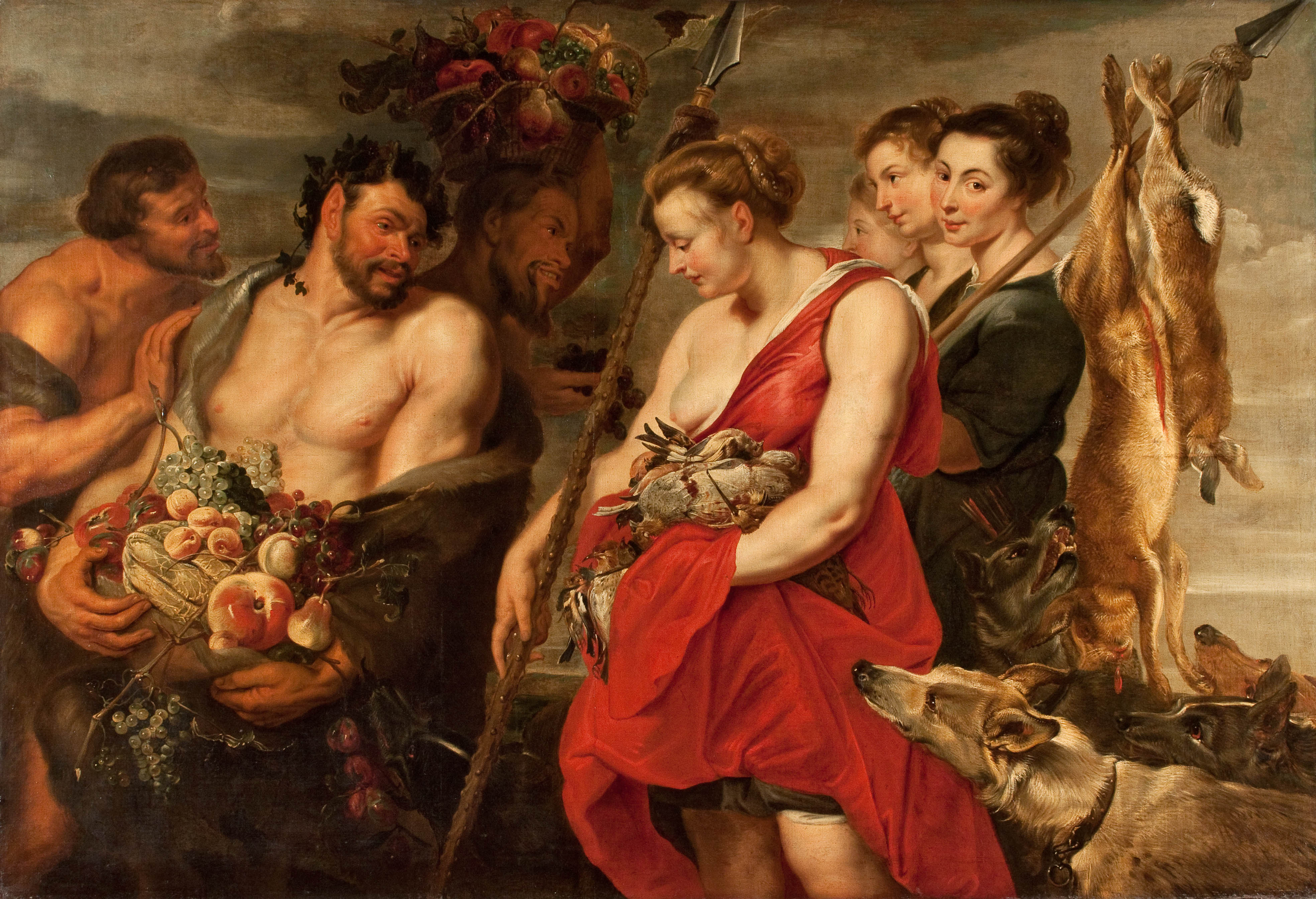
Diana presenting catch to Pan by Rubens 1615, W: 211.5 cm (83.3 in). H: 145 cm(57.1 in).

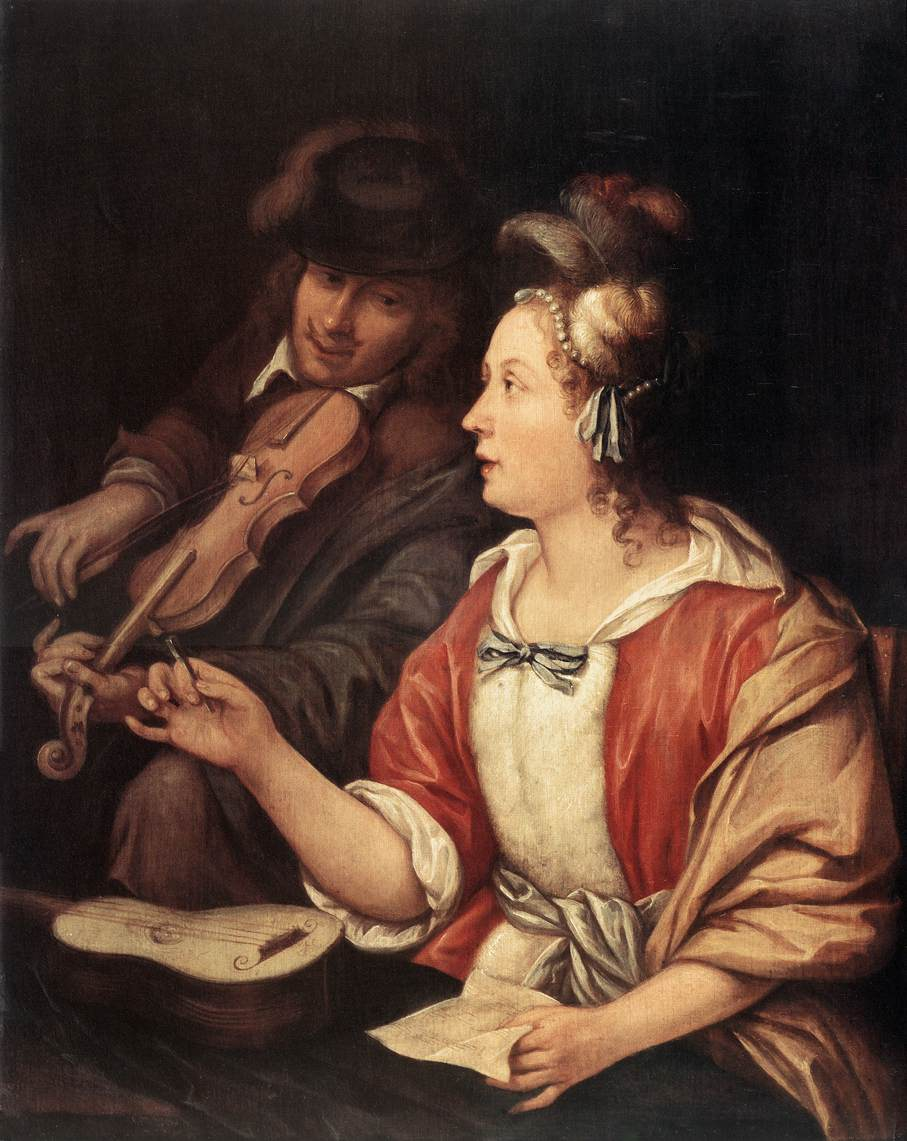
The Music Lessons, by Frans van Mieris the Elder (c. 1650)

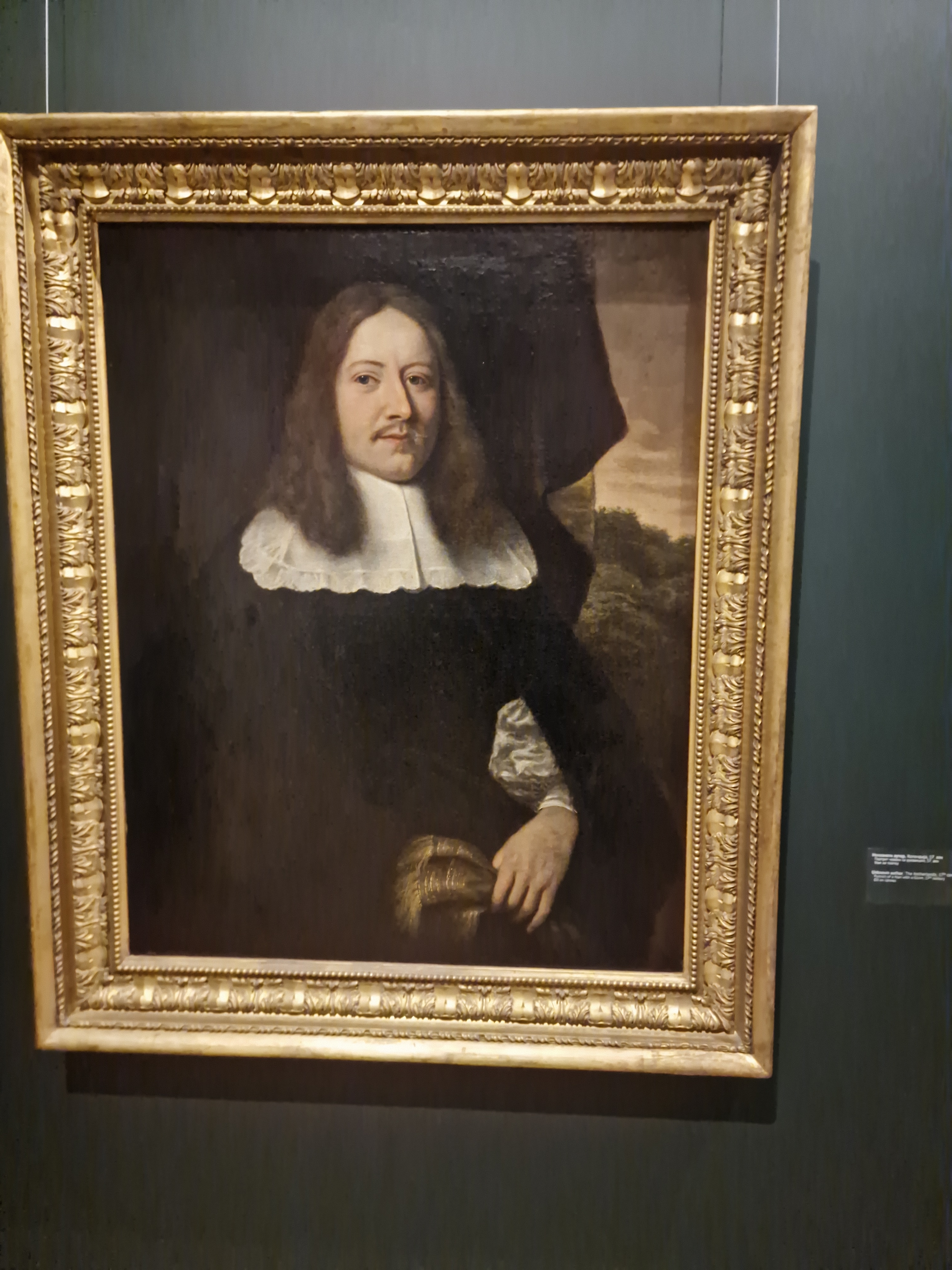
Portrait of man, attributed to Ferdinand Bol

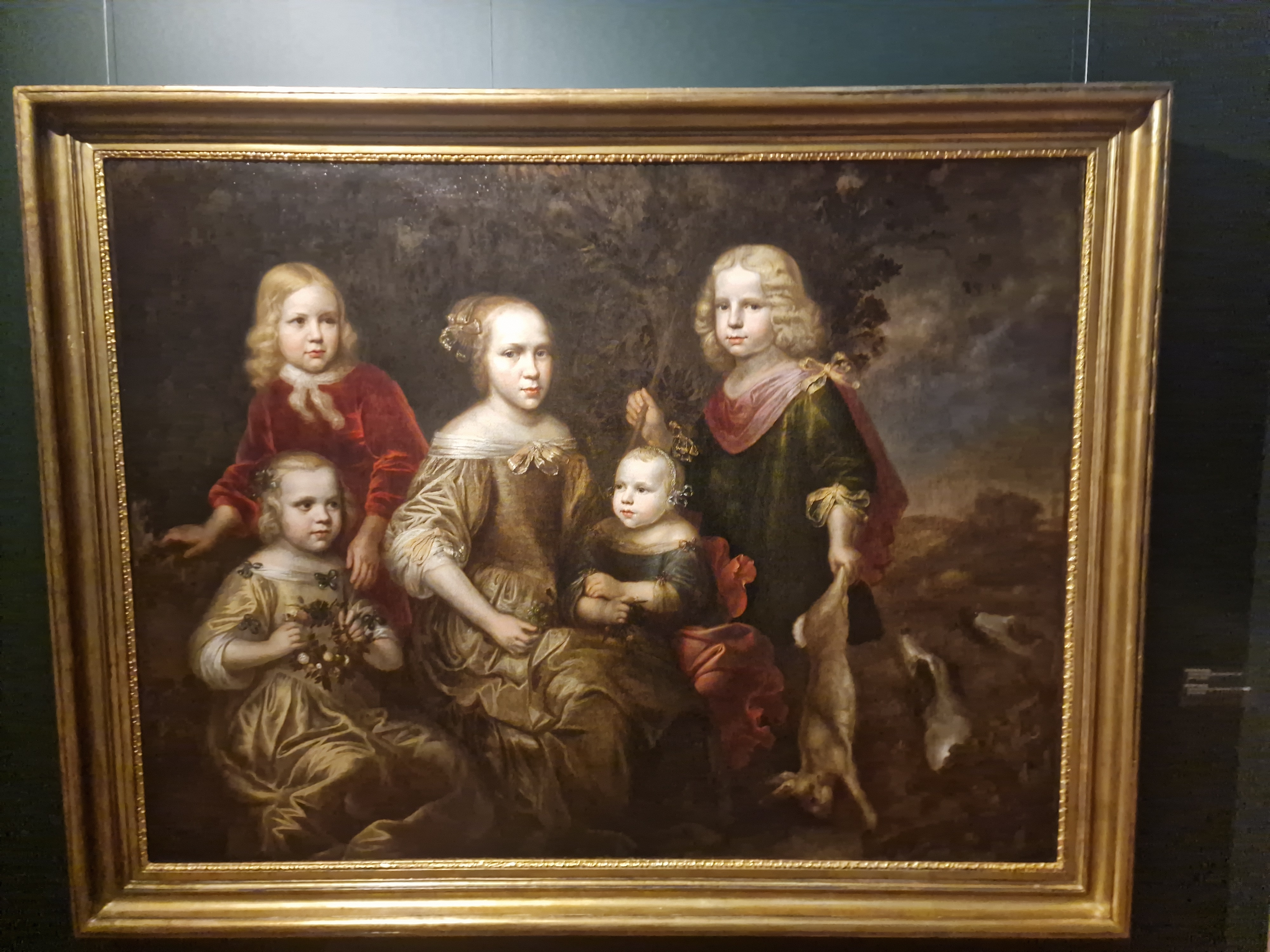
Portrait of children, at. Gonzales Coques

Peasant Woman Standing Indoor, by Vincent van Gogh (1885)

Writer at his desk, by Vincent van Gogh

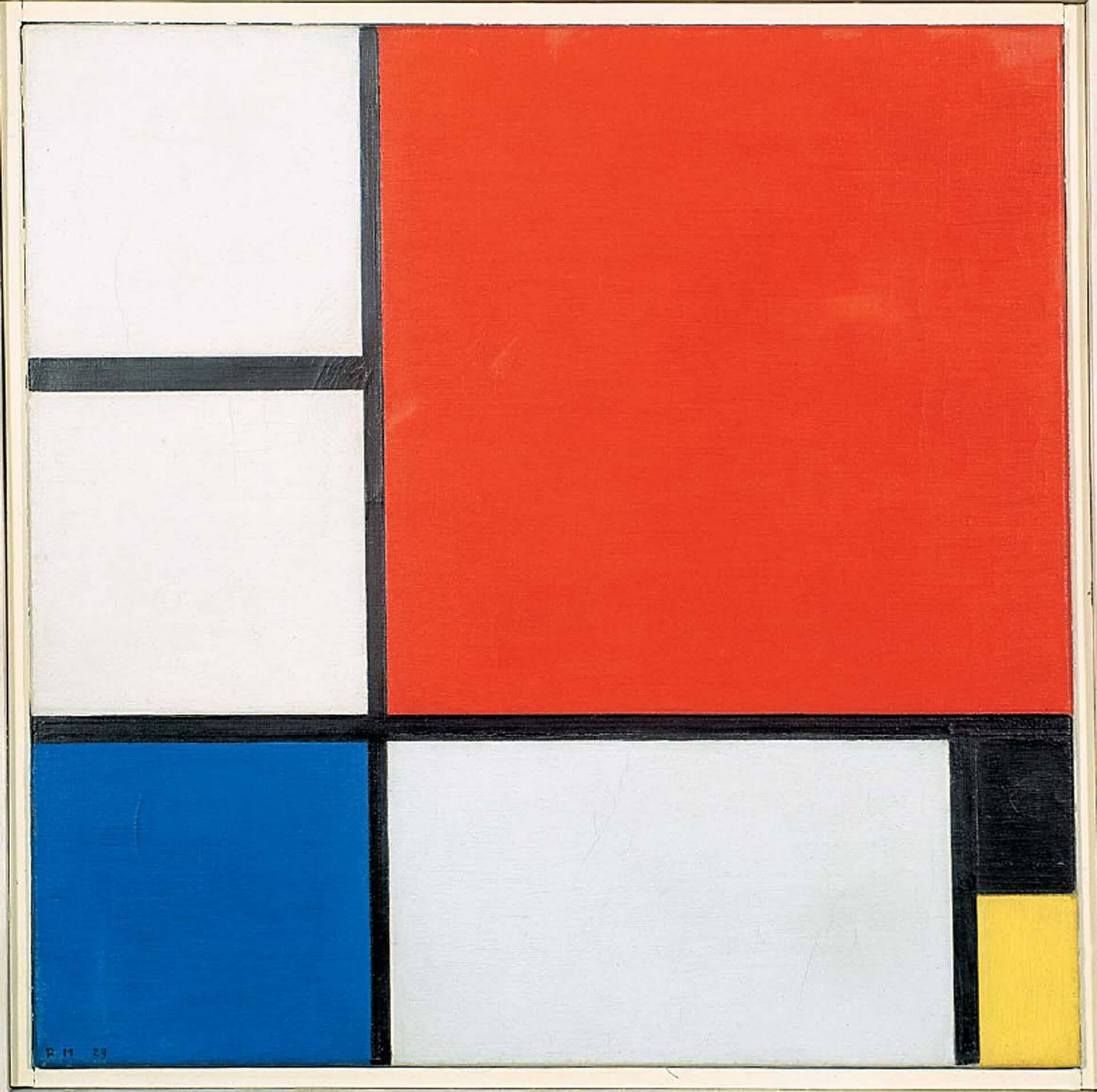
Composition II by Piet Mondrian (1921)

==== French art collection ====
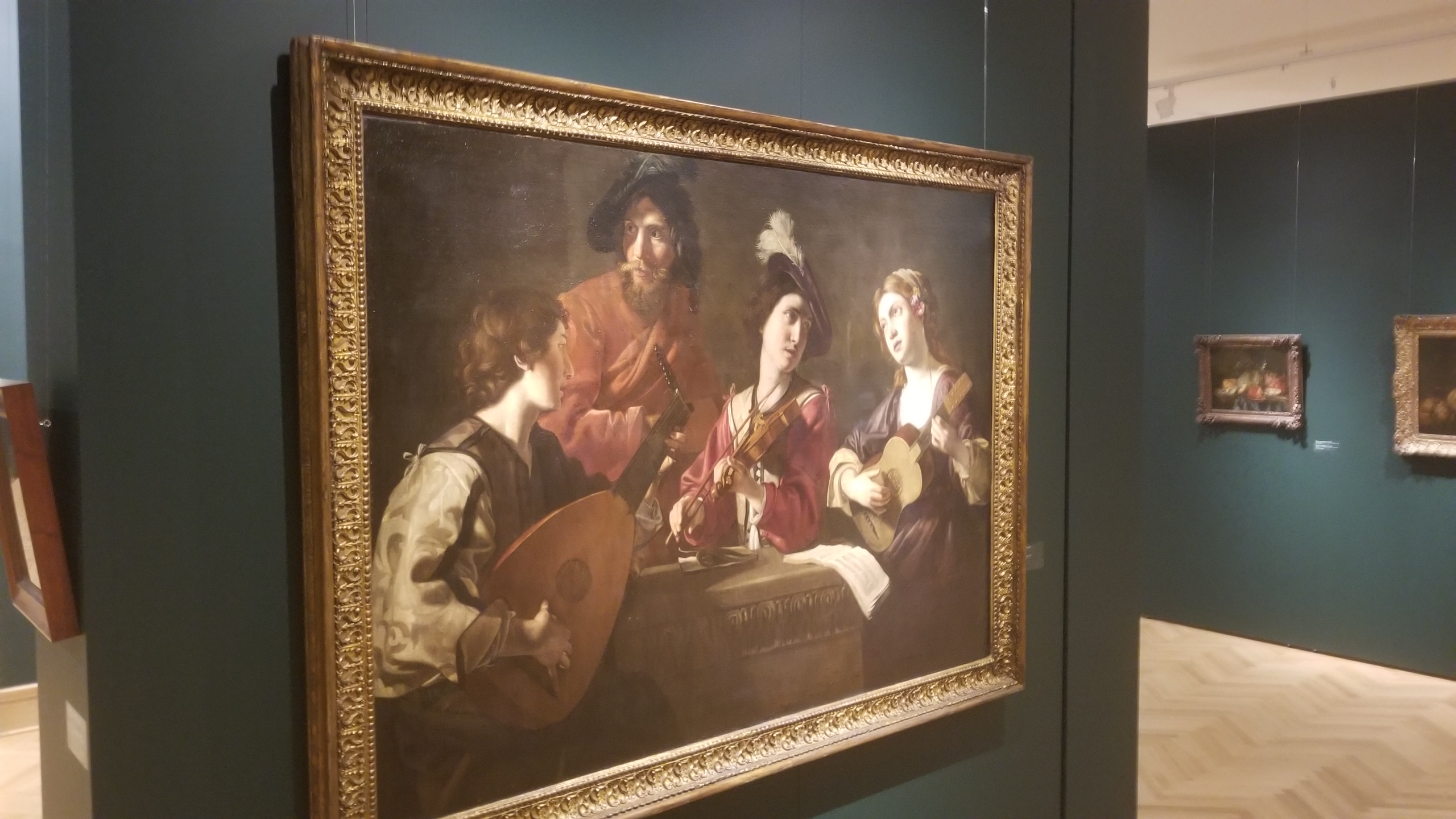
The Concert, by Nicolas Tournier

Place du Theatre Francais: Sun effect, by Camille Pissarro 1898

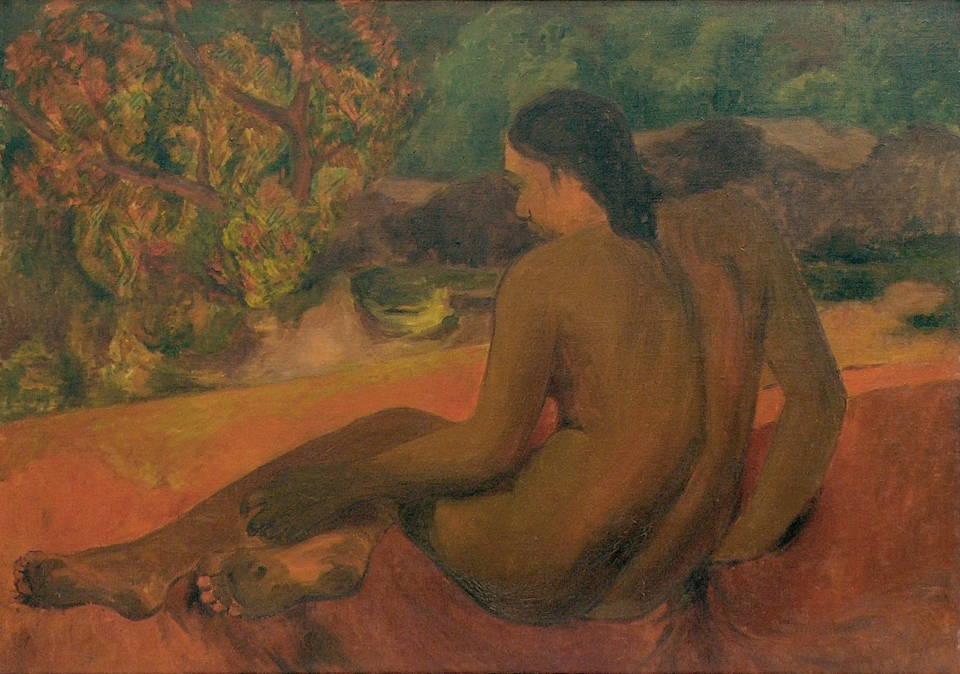
'Tahitian Girl', by Gauguin (1886)

The French Art Collection consists of more than 250 paintings and more than 400 graphics and drawings, from the 16th to early 20th century, including the Slomovic Collection (58 paintings and over 200 graphics). Among the French painters represented in the collection are Nicolas Tournier, Robert Tournières, Hubert Robert, Gauguin, Renoir, Lautrec, Matisse, Monet, Cézanne, Degas, Corot, Paul Signac, Maurice Utrillo, Rodin, Georges Rouault, Pierre Bonnard, Pissarro, Redon, Gustave Moreau, Honoré Daumier, Eugène Carrière, Maurice de Vlaminck, André Derain, Suzanne Valadon, Forain, Robert Delaunay, Rosa Bonheur, Marie Laurencin, Félix Ziem, Berthe Morisot, Sonia Delaunay... The graphic and etching collection includes work by Charles Le Brun, Sébastien Bourdon, Jacques Callot, Charles-François Daubigny, Degas, Delacroix, Jean-Baptiste-Camille Corot, Le Corbusier (3 graphic), Renoir, Jean Cocteau, Eugène Carrière, etc.

Some examples of the collection are:

- Nicolas Tournier, The Concert (canvas 120x169cm) (Earlier, attributed to Caravaggio)
- Robert Tournières, Regent and Ms De Parabere (canvas 96x130 cm)
- Jean-Marc Nattier, Portrait of Lady with Flower (canvas 73x59 cm)
- Hubert Robert, Stairway of Farnese Palace Park (canvas 217x149cm)
- Cézanne, Bathers (watercolor),
- Renoir, Nude (canvas 129.5 cm × 172.7 cm (51 in × 68 in))
- Monet, Rouen Cathedral (canvas)
- Henri de Toulouse-Lautrec, Female portrait (canvas),
- Gauguin, Tahitian girl (oil on canvas – 143 x 98 cm),
- Degas, Bust man in soft hat, Women Leaving her Bath etc
- Pissarro, Place du Theatre Francais-Sun effect (canvas),
- Matisse, Beside the Window (canvas), Purple Beeches (canvas),
- Corot, In the Park (canvas) and Landscape from Italy (canvas),
- André Derain, Sailboats at Carriéres, (canvas)
- Paul Signac, Woman drink a tea (canvas),
- Pierre Bonnard, Reading Lady (canvas),
- Édouard Vuillard, Interior (tempera),
- Robert Delaunay, Runners (canvas)
The Regent and the countess de Parabère, by Robert Tournières

Rouen Cathedral by Claude Monet 1892

Stairway of Farnese Palace Park, by Hubert Robert (canvas 217x149cm)

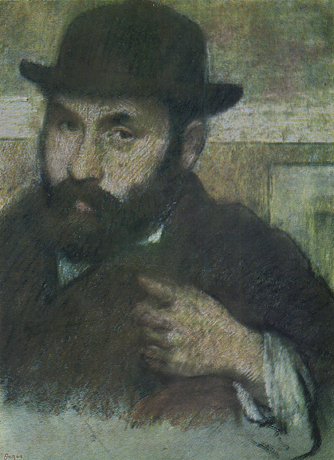
Bust man with soft hat, by Degas

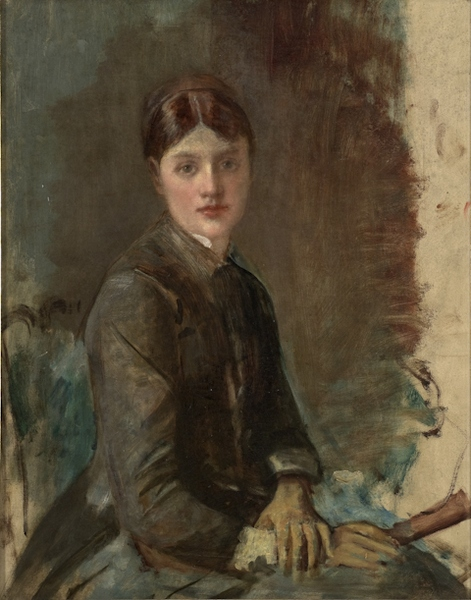
Female Portrait, by Henri de Toulouse-Lautrec

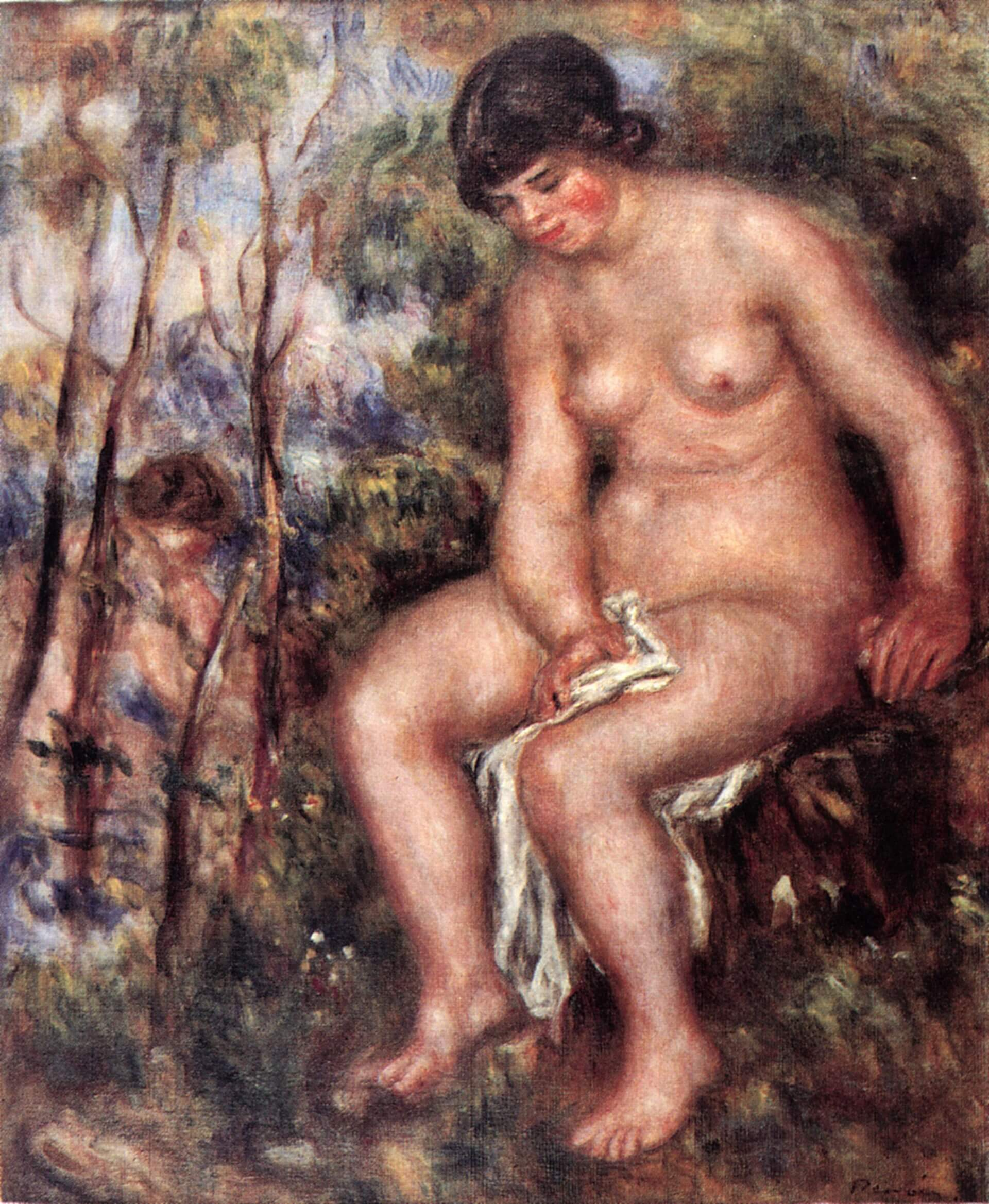
Nude, by Pierre-Auguste Renoir

==== Russian art collection ====
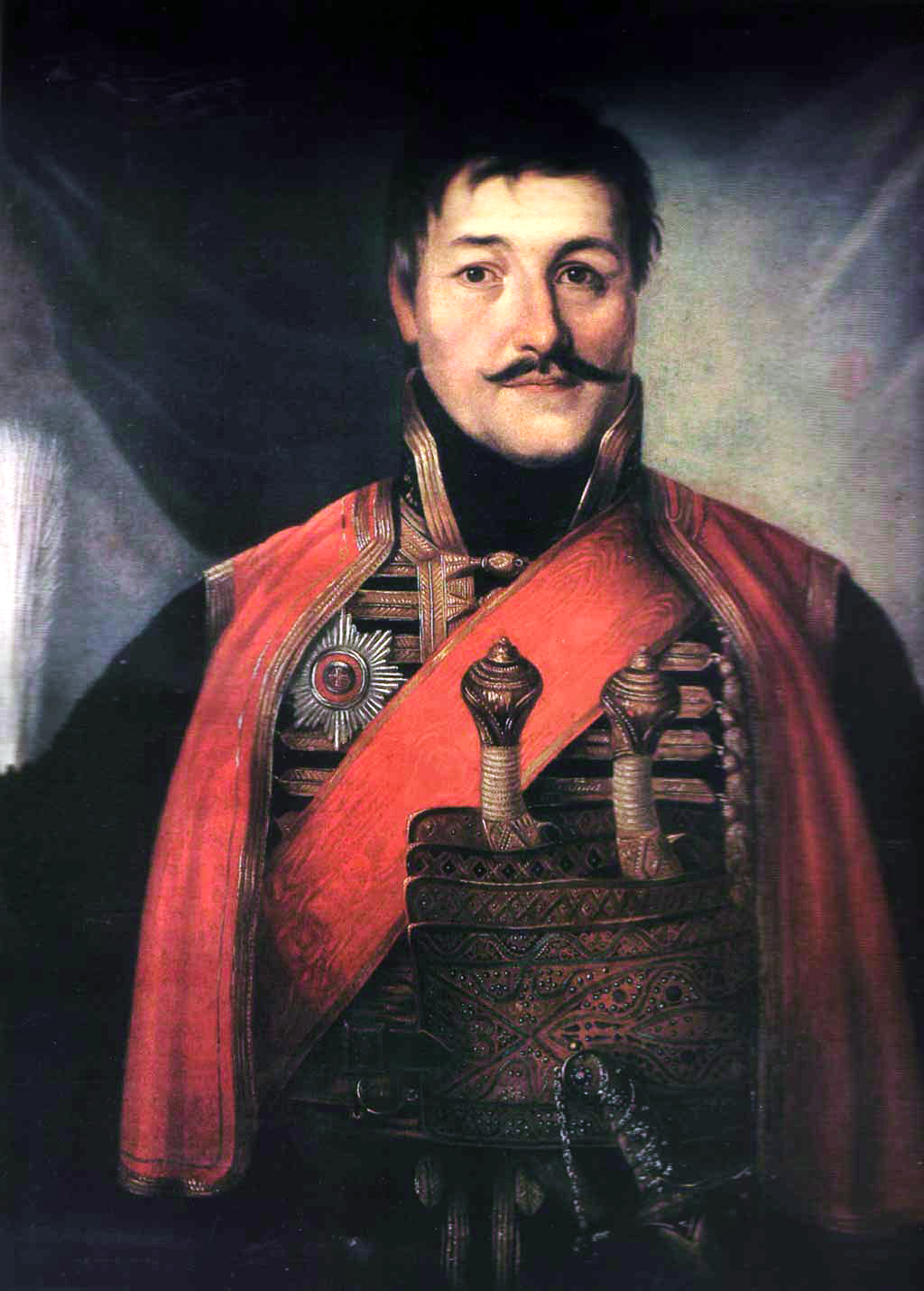
Portrait of Karageorge by Vladimir Borovikovsky (1816)

The Russian art collection has 90 paintings, and numerous prints, etchings and was mostly donated by Prince Paul of Yugoslavia. The collection also has over 100 icons from the 15th to the 19th centuries. The collection includes work by painters and sculptors such as Ivan Aivazovsky, Marc Chagall, Kandinsky, Roerich, Repin, Filipp Malyavin, Alexei Harlamov, Mikhail Larionov, Boris Grigoriev, Vladimir Borovikovsky, Pavel Kuznetsov, Konstantin Korovin, Kazimir Malevich, Alexandre Benois, El Lissitzky, Mstislav Dobuzhinsky, Alexander Nikolayevich Samokhvalov, Pyotr Nilus, Marie Bashkirtseff etc.

Some examples of the collection are:

- Orest Kiprensky, Portrait of Emperors Son (canvas)
- Ivan Aivazovsky, On the Black Sea Coast (canvas 90×130 cm)
- Nicholas Roerich Holy Guests (canvas 82×153), Church Bells Tolling,
- Wassily Kandinsky, Binc on Rugen, Orange 1923.
- Ilya Repin, Nikolai Kuznetcov Portrait, Woman dressed traditionally,
- Konstantin Makovsky, Portrait of Prince Nikolai Michailovich (canvas 107×73 cm),
- Vladimir Borovikovsky, Portrait of Karageorge (1816)
- Marc Chagall, Old man and cow,
- Alexander Archipenko, Two women (canvas), Nude (drawing)
- El Lissitzky, Winning over Sun (aquarel)

==== English art collections ====
Lady Gavrag Portrait by George Frederic Watts

Includes painters usually from the late 19th century, mostly impressionist and post-impressionist. The vast majority of the collection was donated by Prince Paul of Yugoslavia before World War II. In collection is 64 paintings and watercolors and 51 graphics and etchings. They include painters such as Alfred Sisley, Charles Conder, Philip Wilson Steer, Walter Sickert, Hermione Hammond, James Bolivar Manson, Wyndham Lewis, Roger Fry, Duncan Grant, Vanessa Bell and Rowland Fisher, and graphic works from William Hogarth.

Some examples of the collection are:

- Charles Jervas, Portrait of Anthony van Dyck
- John Constable, Landscape (watercolor)
- George Morland, Stable with Boars
- Clarkson Frederick Stanfield, Sea with Fishermans Sailboats (1862)
- Frank Holl, Return from Walking (1877)
- Alfred Sisley, Barges on the Loing
- Charles Conder, On the beach
- Walter Sickert, Street in Dieppe
- George Frederic Watts, Lady Garvagh
- James Bolivar Manson, Still Life with Flowers, View from Houton Sussex
- Augustus John, Infaint portrait Beatrice
- Duncan Grant, Sunny Countryside, Haystacks
- William Rothenstein, Laurence of Arabia Portrait 1921 (canvas)
- Roger Fry, Nude on the Spring 1921
- Vanessa Bell, Roofs

==== Japanese art collection ====
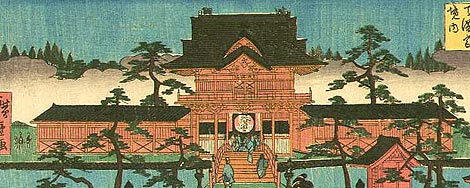
View of Edo, by Hirosige

The Japanese Art Collection has 220 works including 36 graphics and paintings (all the graphics belonging to the Ukiyo-e genre, which developed in Japan from the 17th to 19th century – one of the most frequent motifs was the city of Edo). The collection also contains work from Kunisada, Toyokuni, Keisai Eisen, Hiroshige, Utamaro, and Tsuguharu Foujita.

- Kunisada: Actor Portraits series, Wind gusts, Act from series Geishas ,
- Toyokuni : Actor Portraits series, Kabuki Theater, Lady with friend
- Hiroshige: One Hundred Views of Edo (series of graphics), Nihon and Edo bridge, Garden with plum trees, Fashion store in Olema street
- Ginko Adaci: Ladies
- Sadahida Giokuran, Geisha Hanaogi
- Utamaro, Boy and mouse

==== Austrian and German art collections ====
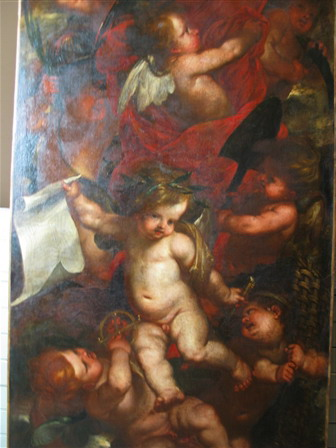
Pan with Puttas, by Peter Strudel

Austrian and German art collection in National Museum in Belgrade has 112 paintings and numerous graphics and etchings. Painters were usually from 19th and 20th century, while graphics are from the 15th century. Most famous painters in collection are Max Liebermann, Lovis Corinth, Fritz von Uhde, Karl Hofer, while prints works include Albrecht Dürer (49 prints), Gustav Klimt, Lovis Corinth, Max Slevogt etc. Most paintings were donated by House of Obrenović and Prince Paul of Yugoslavia. Some of the works are:

- Bartholomäus Zeitblom St Anne with Virgin and child, part of polyptih
- Bartholomäus Zeitblom Saint Catherine, part of polyptih
- Philipp Peter Roos, Shepherd with the Herd (c. 1690)
- Peter Strudel, Pan with Puttas (canvas 190 x 99 cm c. 1690)
- Georg Philipp Rugendas, Battle from Three Hundred Years' War (canvas 89x123cm c. 1700)
- Jacob Philipp Hackert, Ruins (watercolor 1781)
- Franz Krüger, Portrait of Elenore Mayer Gerhard (canvas 1840) and Portrait of Wolf Mayer
- Moritz Michael Daffinger, Prince Milos Obrenovic Portrait
- Max Liebermann, House with Garden, Flea Market in Munich
- Franz Eybl, Portrait of Emillia von Kommeter
- Leopold Kupelwieser, Portrait of Man with white collar
- Friedrich von Amerling, Portrait of Young Woman
- Fritz von Uhde, Woman on the window (1890)
- Moise Kisling, Woman in black dress c.1928, Female Act
- Max Ernst, Conversation with Himera
- Friedrich August von Kaulbach, Head of the Woman (pastel)
- Hans Thoma, Landscape in Swarcvald
- Ferdinand Georg Waldmüller, Portrait of Ms. Tatichek, Portrait of Heinrih Tatichek, Portrait of Young Woman
- Lovis Corinth, Memory of the ball (aquarell), Forest (ink)
- Karl Hofer, Still Life

==== Others Art Collections ====
Other Art Collection in National Museum in Belgrade include works from Spain, USA, Bulgaria, Hungary, Poland, Australia, China, Canada etc..Collections include paintings from El Greco, Picasso, Mary Cassatt, Burne Hogarth, Felix Philipp Kanitz, László Moholy-Nagy, Eduardo Arroyo, Erró, Sol LeWitt etc.

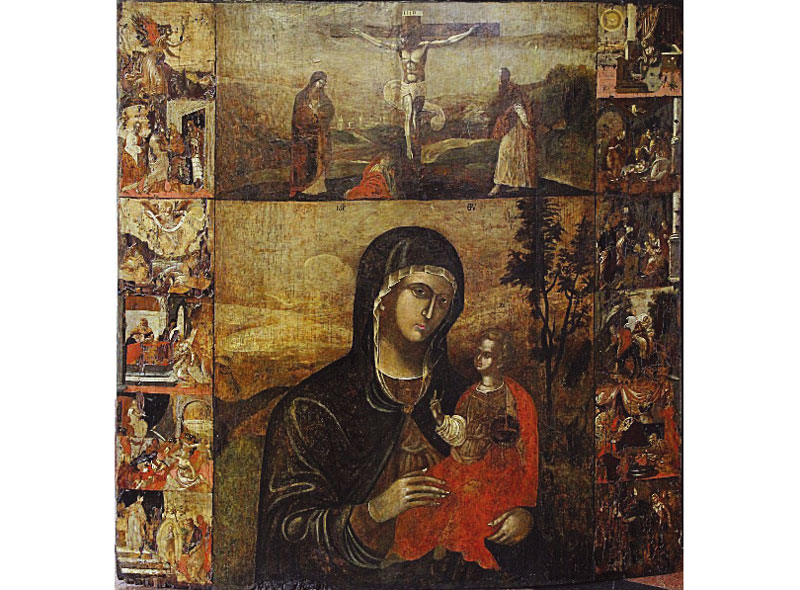
Madre della Consolazione, by El Greco (1560)

Head of the Woman by Pablo Picasso 1909

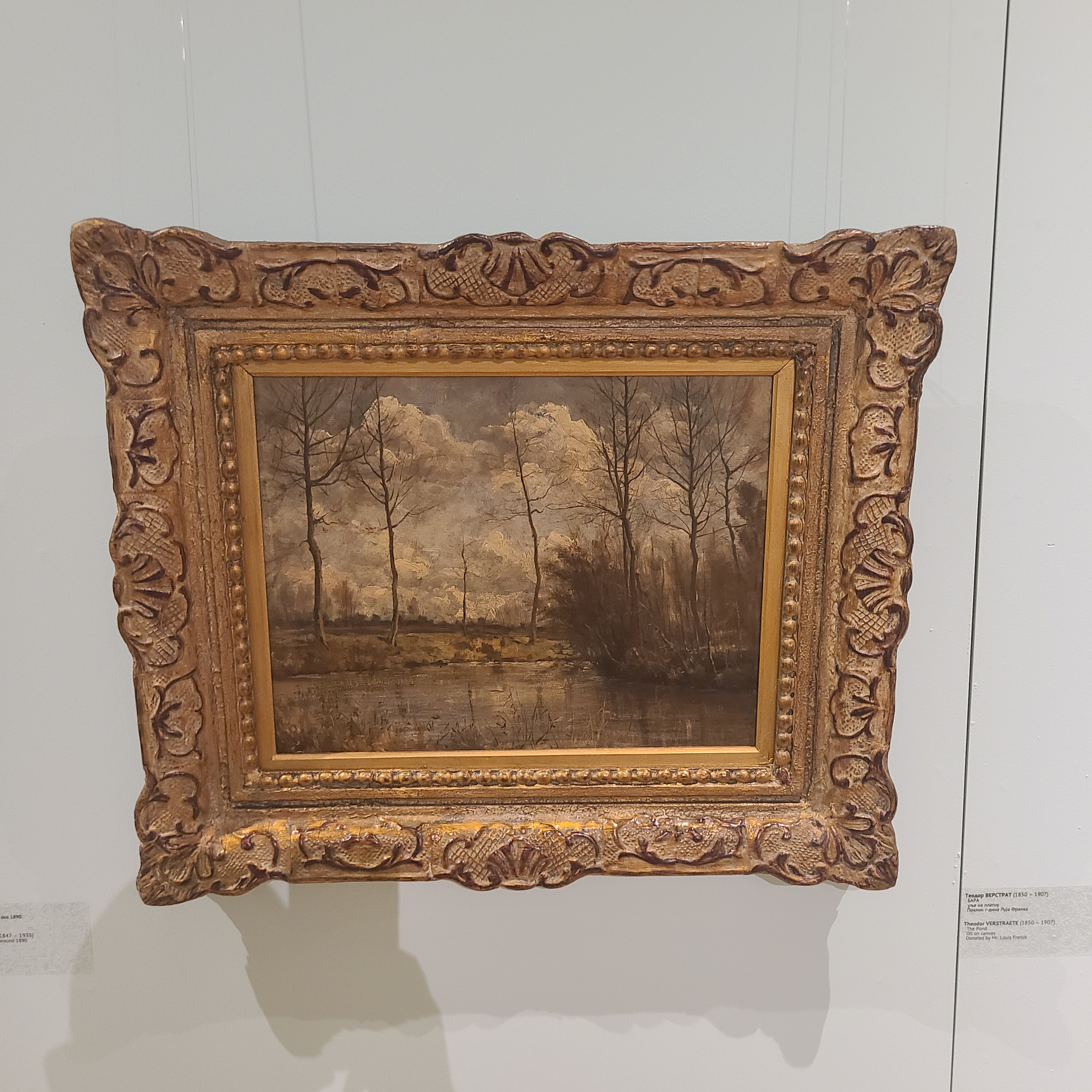
Pond by Theodoor Verstraete

Some of works are:

- El Greco, Holy Mother of Consolation (1560–1570) {On loan from Serbian Orthodox Church}
- Pablo Picasso (13 works), Head of the Woman (oil on canvas), Two Women (watercolor), Interior with Three Figures (drawing), Modest Meal (drawing), Woman with Book (etching), Horseman (drawing), Arlekin (pastel) etc.
- Antoni Clavé, Composition I, Composition II and Composition III
- Charles Demuth, Flowers
- Julius Rolshoven, Female Act
- Frederic Porter Vinton, Landscape with the Lake
- Theodoor Verstraete, The Pond
- Mary Cassatt, (7 pastels), Girl with Cat, Girl and Dog, Woman Holding a Child, etc.
- Leon Kroll, Miroslav Spalajković Portrait
- Mark Tobey, Hornpipe (oil on cardboard)
- Alfred Stevens, Woman gathering shells 1883.
- Sol LeWitt, Composition with yellow, blue and red (gouaches)
- Neville Lewis, Black Woman
- Jules Pascin, Terrace(1920)
- Endre Nemes, Visiting Paris (aquarel), Composition (aquarel) and Needlework (canvas)
- Aurél Bernáth, Mikulas, (pastel)
- László Moholy-Nagy, Architecture in Glass 1921
- Wacław Borowski, After Hunting (canvas 100x86cm)
- Roman Artymowski, Pesimistic Landscape (canvas 60x81cm)
- Stanisław Witkiewicz, Han Saraj
- Kazimierz Sichulski, Conquering Kraków 1025 AD (tempera 150x317cm)
- Jaroslav Čermák, Refugies from Herzegovina)
- Nikola Marinov, Three Females (watercolor), Two Girls in the Field
- Bencho Obreshkov, Bridge over Maritza, Prince Paul of Yugoslavia, Still Life with Cherries, Vase with Blue Flowers, Landscape
- Felix Philipp Kanitz, Soko town, Timok Valley, Nis, Janja Tana, Kalna Tana, Timok Gorge and Pirot
- Mór Than, Karageorge Murder (1863, 110x142)
- Erró, From Mouse Hole, A Moi (serigraphic), No Name Guillotine
- Antonio Seguí, Farewell to Arms
- Zao Wou Ki, Landscape in Great Valley (watercolor)

==== Serbian and Yugoslav art collection ====
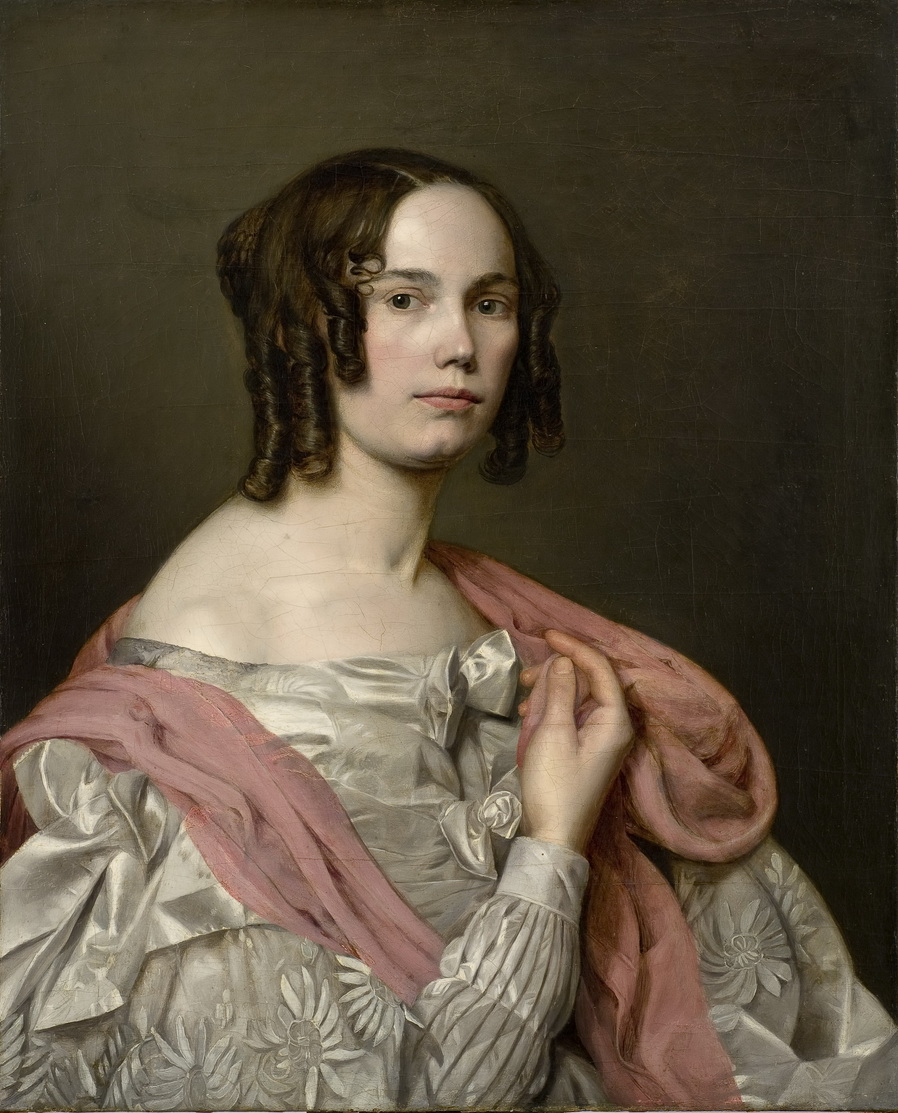
Self Portrait, by Katarina Ivanovic (1836)

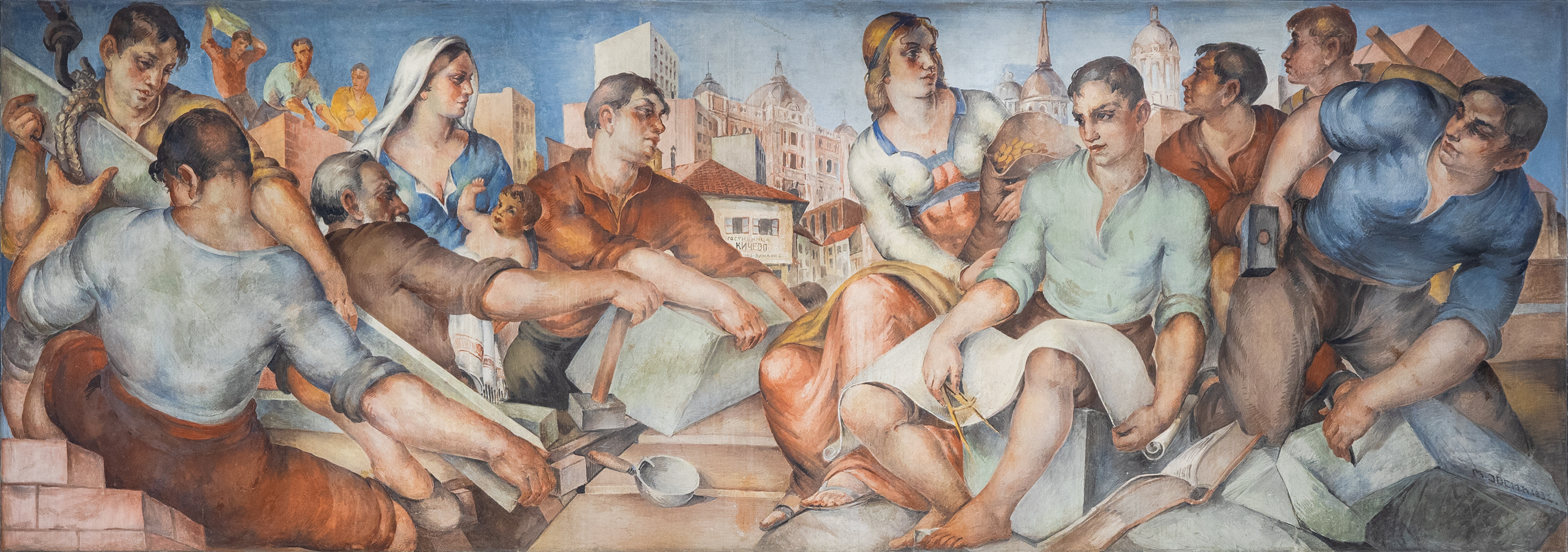
Fresco Dogradnja palate Hipotekarne banke by Mladen Josić on stairway to last floor with exposition to Yugoslav art of 20. century

The Wedding of Emperor Dusan

The Serbian and Yugoslav Art Collection consists of more than 6,000 pieces created between the 17th and 20th century. Some of the artists represented are: Marina Abramović, Milovan Destil Marković, Paja Jovanović, Stojan Aralica, Petar Lubarda, Milan Konjović, Uroš Predić, Đura Jakšić, Marko Murat, Đorđe Andrejević Kun, Nadežda Petrović, Petar Dobrović, Mića Popović and Sava Šumanović. There are also Slovenian Art works with Matija Jama- (7 canvases), Avgust Černigoj – (6 works), Sketch for theater, Rihard Jakopič – (7 canvases) Birch Trees, Ivan Grohar, Na Pasi and Matej Sternen (4 canvases) Female Reader etc.

- Teodor Kračun, Christ Resurrection (c. 1780), St. Apostle Thomas, St. Apostle Mark, St. John's Divine and Abraham's Victim
- Konstantin Danil, Madonna, Male Portrait, Still Life, Stanci Deli Portrait, Archangel Gabriel, Ms Vajgling Portrait, Ms Tetesi Portrait, General Stevan Knicanin Portrait, Portrait of Lady with Cross and MsWife Sofia Portrait
- Paja Jovanović, Crowning of Stefan Dušan, The Wedding of Stefan Dusan, Portrait of Ms. Hudson, Nikola Pašić Portrait, Woman in pink dress, Selling Manasija Monastir model, Ms. Pupin Portrait, Decorating Bride, Arnaut with cibok, The Fencing Lesson, His wife Munie, Portrait of Woman with Hat, The Uprising at Takovo, Stefan Decanski, Sopoćani Monastir, Portrait of Romanian King Ferdinand, Diana, Nude, Portrait of Simington, Portrait of Josip Broz Tito, Furor Teutonicus, Flowers, Cocks fighting, Portrait of Gedeon Dundjerski, Portrait of Ms. Hudson, House in Kars, Traitor, Motive from Celarevo, Marco, Milos and Vila and Prince Lazar
- Nadežda Petrović (86 paintings), Kosovo peonies, Self Portrait
- Uroš Predić (13 paintings), Amoretti, Small Philosopher, Fieldmarshal Živojin Mišić Portrait, Saint Sava bless children, Hardworking hands, Cheerful brothers, Konstantin Danil Portrait, Djordje Krstic Portrait, Ljuba Ivanović Portrait, Girl with doll, Orphan and Refugees from Herzegovina
- Đura Jakšić, Self Portrait, Woman in blue dress, Karadjordje Assassination, Prince Milan Obrenovic Portrait, Director Ciric Portrait, Prince Michael on catafalque, Emperor Dusan, Watchtower, St. George, Prince Marco, Banovic Strahinja, Fireworks on the Stambol Gate and Christ on the forest
- Beta Vukanović, Summer Day
- Uroš Knežević (2 paintings), Boy with feather
- Petar Dobrović (21 paintings) Karlo's Bridge, Monumental Horses on San Marco Square in Venice, Shipan, Adriatic landscape, Ana Trezibašić Portrait
- Đorđe Krstić (13 paintings), Woman underneath apple tree, Anatomist, Studenica Monastery, Zica Monastery, Drawn Girl, Djele Kula, On the spring, St. Nickolas, St.George's Oath, Zica Monastery Interior, Babakajand Stalac Capitulation
- Marko Murat (28 paintings), Spring and Dubrovnik's Spring
- Sava Šumanović (25 paintings, 1 drawing), Sidjanke, Autumn's way, Nude, Bridge in town, Wagtail, Nude on red carpet
- Milan Konjović (15 paintings), Stradun, Wheat fields and Toncika
- Petar Lubarda (23 painting), Sea's Cliffs
- Marina Abramović (4 works), Performans 77, Oblak and his Projection (canvas 130x120), Kisses from Moscow and Exhibition Bologna 1977.
- Milovan Destil Marković (5 works), Aureole with Lead (Olovke)

==== Sculptures ====
The museum houses sculptures from the early Roman period to the 20th century. The Yugoslav Collection consists of 850 works and the foreign collection has over 50. The most significant collections come from sculptors such as Ivan Meštrović – (96 works), Toma Rosandic, Antun Augustinčić, Frano Kršinić, César Baldaccini, Aristide Maillol, George Minne, Kai Nielsen (sculptor), Risto Stijović, Matija Vuković and Julije Knifer.

- Jules Dalou, Seating Male Figure
- Ivan Meštrović (45 works), Angel of Death, Banovic Strahinja Torso (marble), Portrait of Mother (marble), Miloš Obilić, Kosovo girl, Srđa Zlopogleđa, Prince Kraljević Marko, Widow, Remembrance, Widow with Child, Two Widows, The Maiden of Kosovo.
- Aristide Maillol, Meditarenian, Nude, Miniature Nude
- Jean-Baptiste Carpeaux, Boy with the Shell, Bahantinian Woman, Sitting Male
- Toma Rosandic, Turkish Heads, Good and Evil, A Young Woman, Tired Fighter, Stone Thrower
- Antun Augustinčić, Bronze Female Nude, Self-Portrait, etc.
- George Minne, The Head of the Nun
- Frano Kršinić, Female Nude in Marble, Siesta
- Kai Nielsen, Leda without Swan
- Yevgeny Vuchetich, Lenin
- Ivan Rendić, After the Bath
- Risto Stijović, Young Girl
- Simeon Roksandić, Dancing Girl
- Sreten Stojanović, Portrait of Father

== Gallery ==
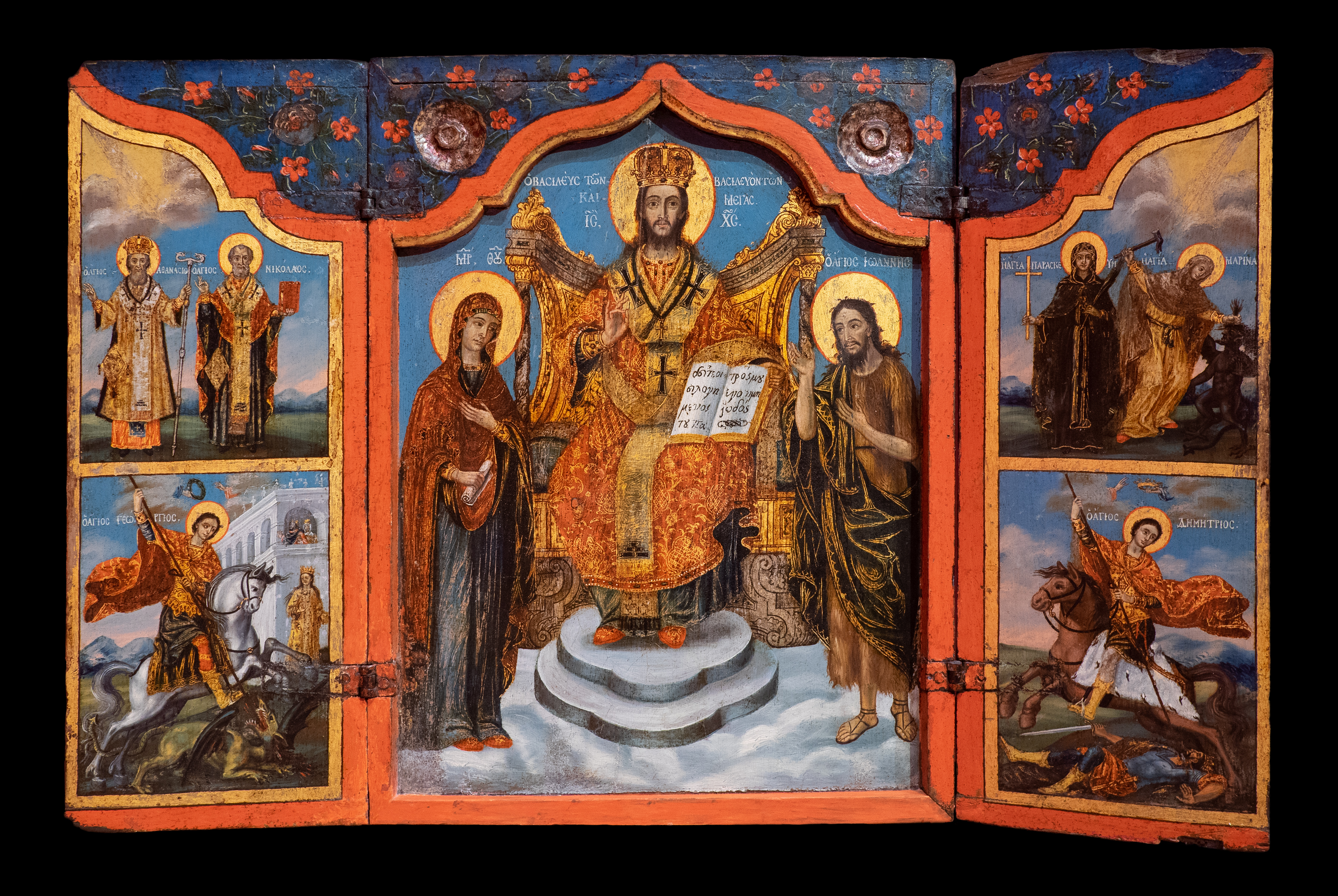
Deesis with Saints, triptych (18–19. century)

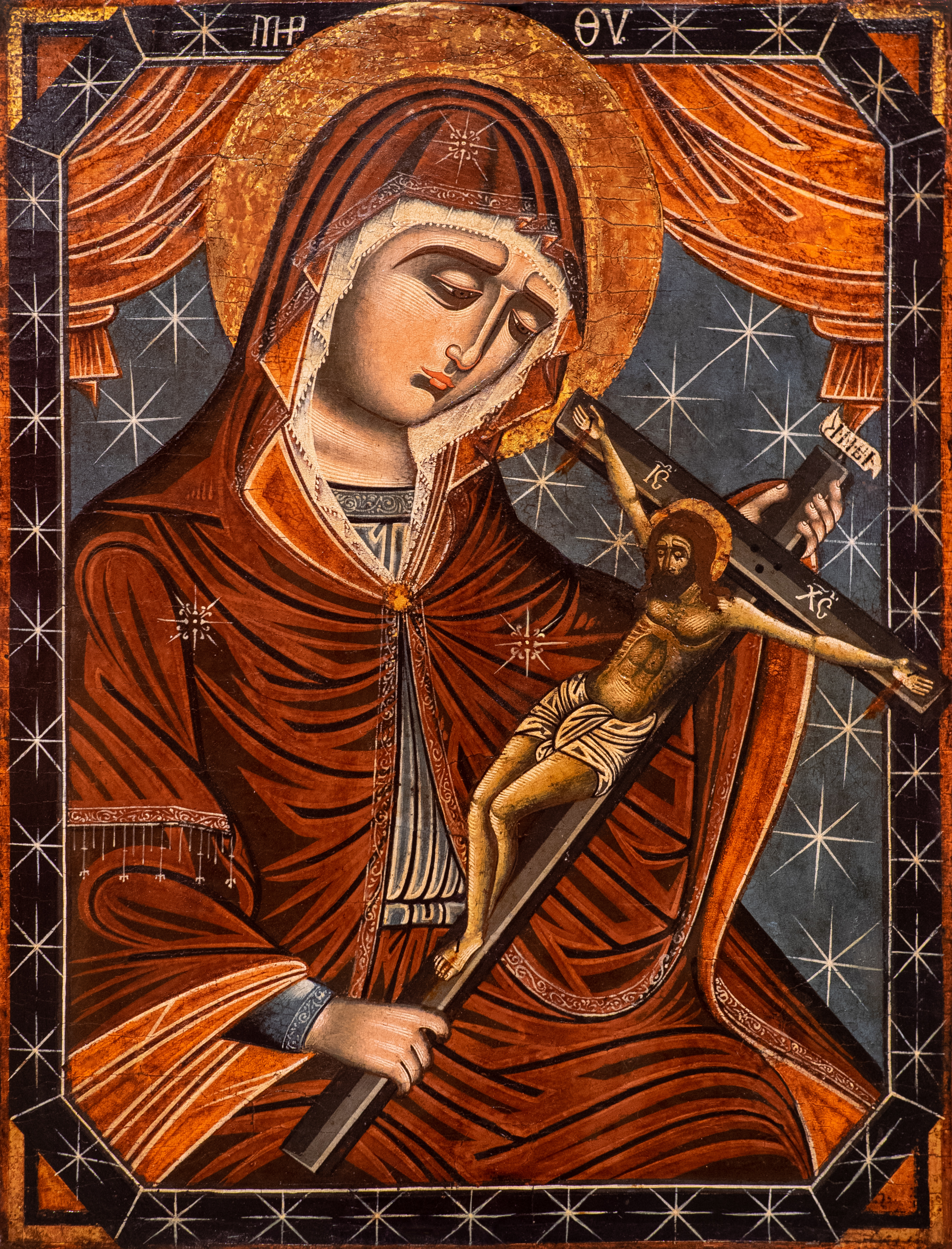
The Mother of God Trenousa (17–18. century)

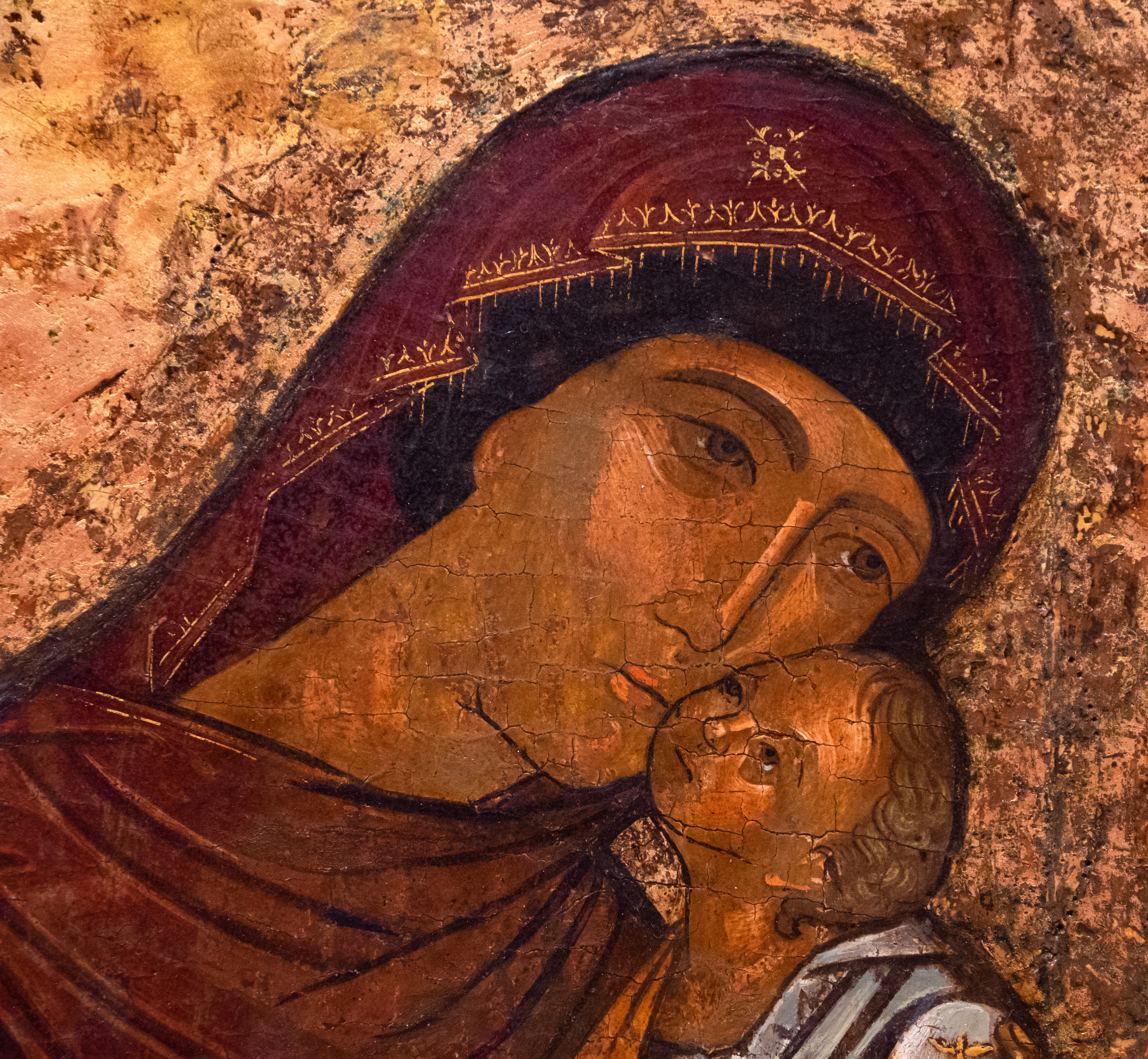
The Theotokos Glykofilousa (16. century)

Annunciation, by unknown Greek Master 1222 copy

White Angel, by unknown Greek Master copy c. 1222 213 cm x 120 cm

Saint Astios and Saint Isauro, by unknown Greek Master 1260

Saint Paul, by Paolo Veneziano

Moving Christ from Cross, Caravaggio's painting copied and attributed to Mattia Preti

Piazza San Marco, Venice, Francesco Guardi, oil on canvas (1765)

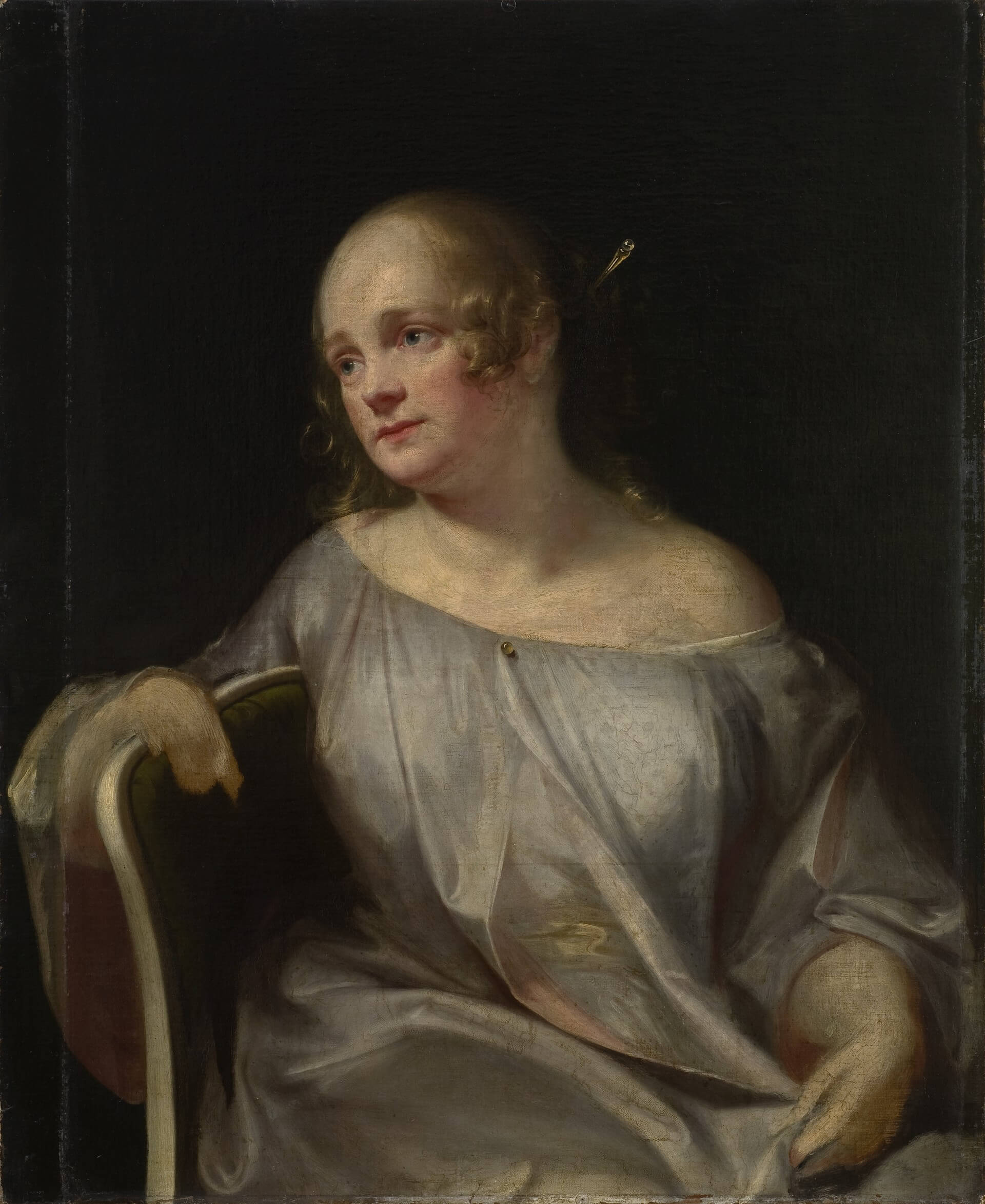
Wife Portrait, by Konstantin Danil c. (1840)

== See also ==
- Beli dvor {King Palace}
- Museum of Contemporary Art (Belgrade)
- Monuments of Culture of Great Importance
- Tourism in Serbia
