= Konstantin Pantelić =

Serbian monk and painter

Konstantin Pantelić (Serbian Cyrillic: Константин Пантелић, 1802–1882) was a Serbian portraitist, icon painter, and monk of the Serbian Orthodox Church. He painted many icons, especially for iconostasis, as well as frescos for churches throughout Srem, Banat and Bačka.

== Biography ==
Konstantin Pantelić's antecedents originally came from Ruma in the Banat in the Kingdom of Hungary (now in the Srem district of the Serbian autonomous province of Vojvodina). He was born in 1802 in his ancestral town of Ruma, When he was about two the area became part of the newly created Austrian Empire.

He attended school in the place he was born. His very first art lessons were from his father Jovan, a lesser-known artist, who also painted icons for the iconostasis. Pantelić became progressively interested in painting while still attending grammar school. He also spent a period of time at the Atelier of Arsenije Teodorović, and that of Stefan Gavrilović. After graduating from the Serbian Lyceum, he received a paid tuition to further his education abroad from the Serbian Orthodox Church on the recommendation of his protégé and teacher Lukijan Mušicki. As an art student, Pantelić benefitted from the generous grant to study under the aegis of Pavel Đurković who was then living and teaching in Odessa, Russia, at the time. In 1828, upon his return from Odessa, he was named administrator of a Serbian parish in Zagreb and in 1830 he was sent to the Eparchy of Temišvar to replace Father Andrejević who died that year.

The following year was commissioned by the Serbian National Church to paint an iconostasis. While in Banat, he was somewhat influenced by Konstantin Danil. Pantelić collaborated with Nikola Aleksić and engraver Marko Konstantinović on several commissions and also with other academically trained painters throughout his career.

== Oeuvre ==
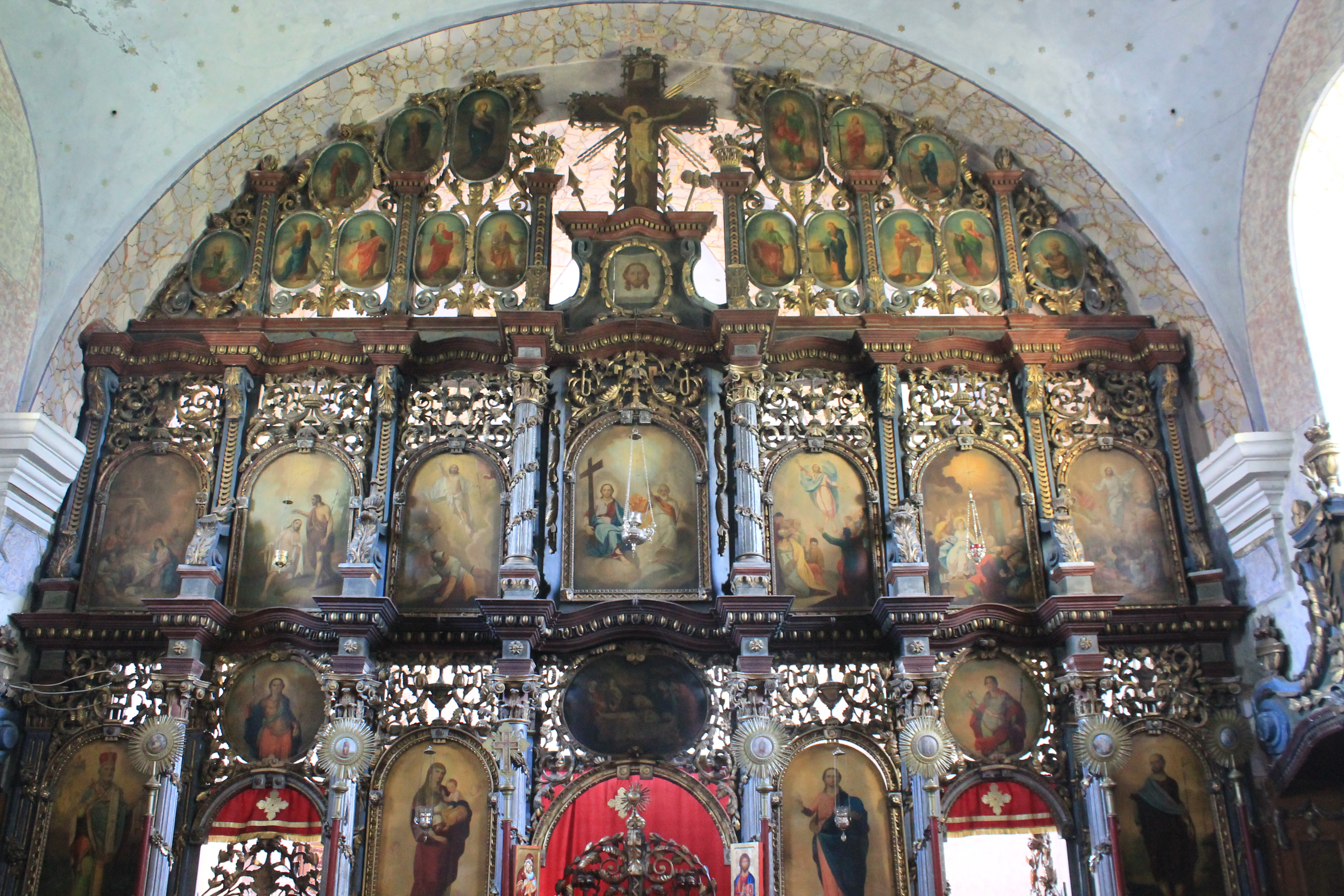
The iconostasis of the Church of St. Nicholas in Bačinci.

- The iconostasis of the St. Nicholas Church in Bačinci in 1831;
- The icon of the Holy Trinity in the Church of St. Joseph in Čerević in 1835;
- The iconostasis of the St. George's Church in Banoštor in 1836;
- Entombment of Christ in the Church of the Nativity of St. John the Baptist in Bačka Palanka in 1836;
- The icon of Saint Wendelin in the Church of the Exaltation-of-the-Holy-Cross in Ruma in 1841;
- The iconostasis of the Church of the Ascension of Deč in 1848
- The frescoes of the vaults and the nave of the Saint-Nicolas Church of Sibač in 1851;
- The iconostasis of the Saint John the Theologian Church of Sremski Mihaljevci in 1855;
- The iconostasis of the St. Nicholas Church in Sakule in 1856–1857;
- The throne icon of the Theotokos in the Church of the Ascension in Ruma in 1860
- The chancel and thrones of the Epiphany Church of Srbobran

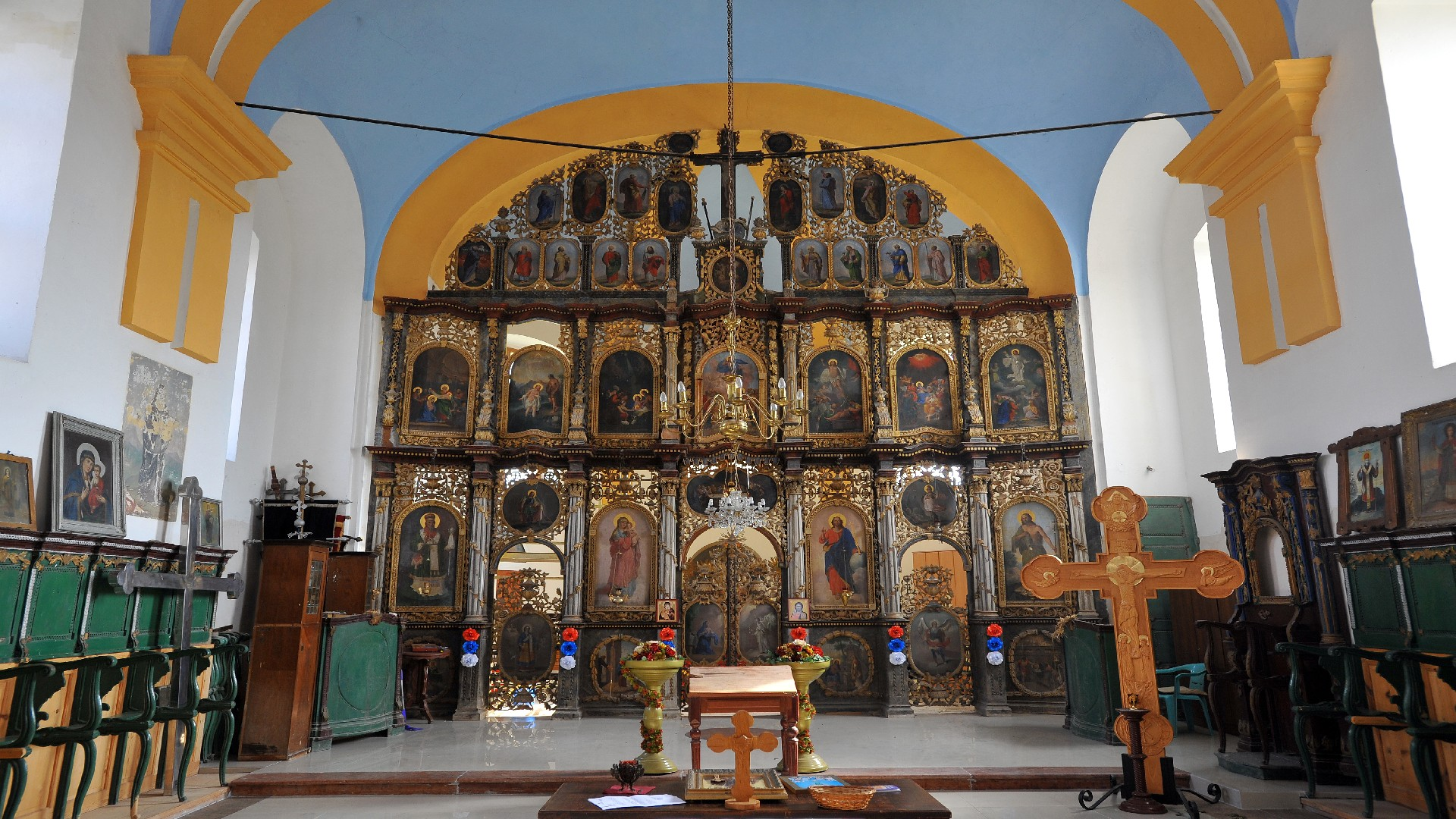
The iconostasis of the Church of the Ascension of Deč.
