= Ilija Matejić =

Serbian politician

Ilija Matejić (Serbian Cyrillic: Илија Матејић; born 23 January 1991) is a politician in Serbia. He has served in the National Assembly of Serbia since 2020 as a member of the Serbian Progressive Party.

== Early life and private career ==
Matejić was born in Kovačica, Vojvodina, in what was then the Republic of Serbia in the Socialist Federal Republic of Yugoslavia. He holds a Bachelor of Laws degree from the University of Belgrade Faculty of Law and is a lawyer by profession. He lives in the village of Crepaja in Kovačica.

== Politician ==
Matejić appeared in the twenty-fifth position on the Progressive Party's electoral list for the Kovačica municipal assembly in the 2016 Serbian local elections. The list won twenty-one mandates. He was not returned and does not appear to have received a mandate as a replacement delegate over the next four years.

He was given the 176th position on the party's Aleksandar Vučić — For Our Children list in the 2020 Serbian parliamentary election and was elected when the list won a landslide majority with 188 mandates. He is a member of the assembly committee on constitutional and legislative issues; a deputy member of the European integration committee and the agriculture, forestry, and water management committee; and a member of Serbia's delegation to the Inter-Parliamentary Union.
