= Milan Garašević =

Serbian politician

Milan Garašević (Serbian Cyrillic: Милан Гарашевић; born 14 April 1982) is a politician in Serbia. He was the mayor of Kovačica from 2016 to 2020 and has served in the Assembly of Vojvodina since 2020. Garašević is a member of the Serbian Progressive Party.

== Private career ==
Garašević is an entrepreneur. He lives in Kovačica.

== Politician ==
=== Municipal politics ===
Garašević received the second position on the Progressive Party's electoral list for Kovačica in the 2016 Serbian local elections and was elected when the list won a majority victory with twenty-one out of thirty-nine seats. He was selected as mayor after the election and served in this role for the next four years.

He led the Progressive list in the 2020 local elections and was re-elected when the list won twenty-one of twenty-nine seats in a reduced assembly. He could not continue as mayor after his election to the provincial assembly but was instead chosen as president (i.e., speaker) of the municipal assembly.

=== Assembly of Vojvodina ===
Garašević was given the twenty-first position on the Progressive Party's list for the Vojvodina assembly in the 2020 provincial election and was elected when the list won a majority victory with seventy-six out of 120 seats. He was chosen as chair of the assembly committee on agriculture in October 2020 and is also a member of the economy committee.
