= Martin Jonaš =

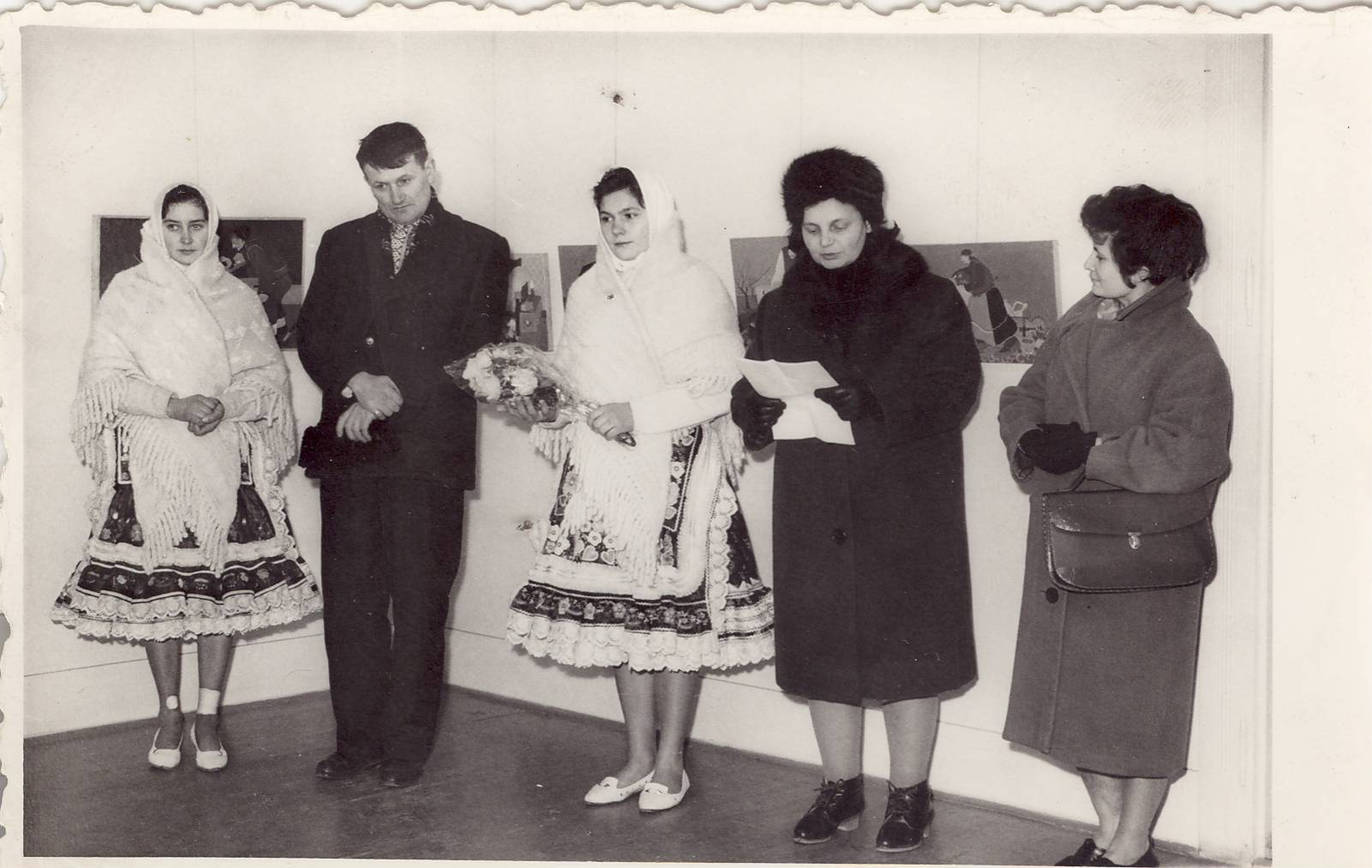
- Martin Jonaš at Museum of Vojvodinian Slovaks in Bački Petrovac in 1963
- Born: 9 May 1924; Kovačica, Kingdom of Serbs, Croats and Slovenes
- Died: 31 January 1996 (aged 71); Belgrade, Serbia, FR Yugoslavia
- Occupation: Painter

Martin Jonaš (1924–1996) was a Serbian naïve artist of Slovak ethnicity.

== Life and work ==
Martin Jonaš was born on May 9, 1924 in Kovačica, where he spent his entire life, both as a farmer and artist. He started painting in 1945 and participated in over 450 individual and group exhibitions.

His solo exhibitions were held in various places in former Yugoslavia, as well as Switzerland, Israel, France, Finland, Norway, USA, and elsewhere. Alongside Salvador Dalí, he won a gold medal at the international drawing exhibition in Italy in 1978. His paintings were characterized by a visually unique way of depicting human figures, with oversized hands and feet, giving special recognition to physical work.

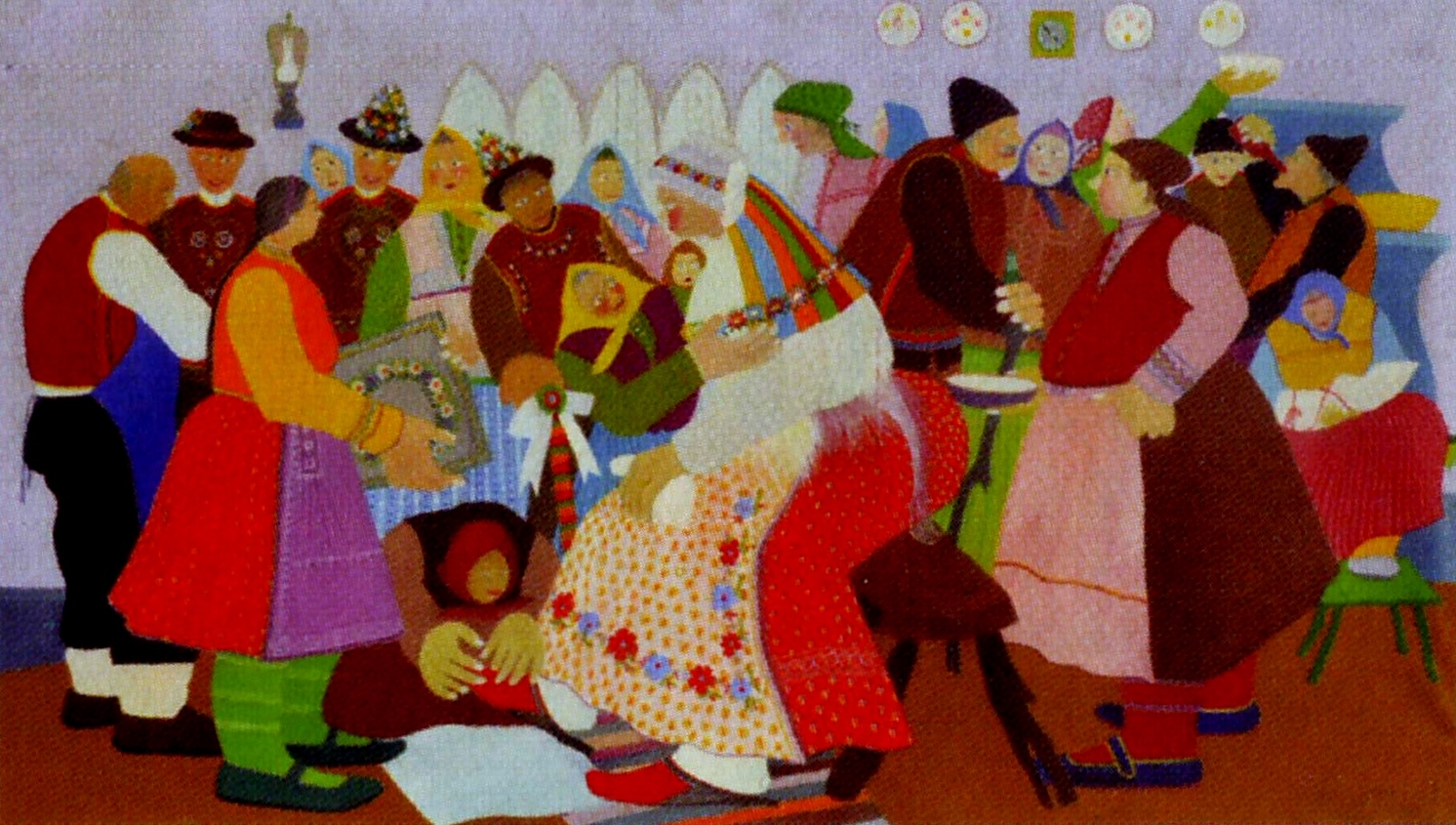
Wedding in Kovačica by Martin Jonaš

Jonaš died in Pančevo, on January 31, 1996. The National Museum of Pančevo marked the 25th anniversary of his death with a special exhibit in 2021.

In 2024, the Republic of Serbia issued a commemorative postage stamp edition, honoring the centennial of Jonaš's birth. The edition features Jonaš's paintings Dom na dlanu (Home in the Palm of Your Hand) and Muškarac i žena na klupi (Man and Woman on a Bench), as well as works from other notable Kovačica naive artists including Pavel Hajko, Jan Glozik, and Zuzana Vereski.

== Memorial house of Martin Jonaš ==
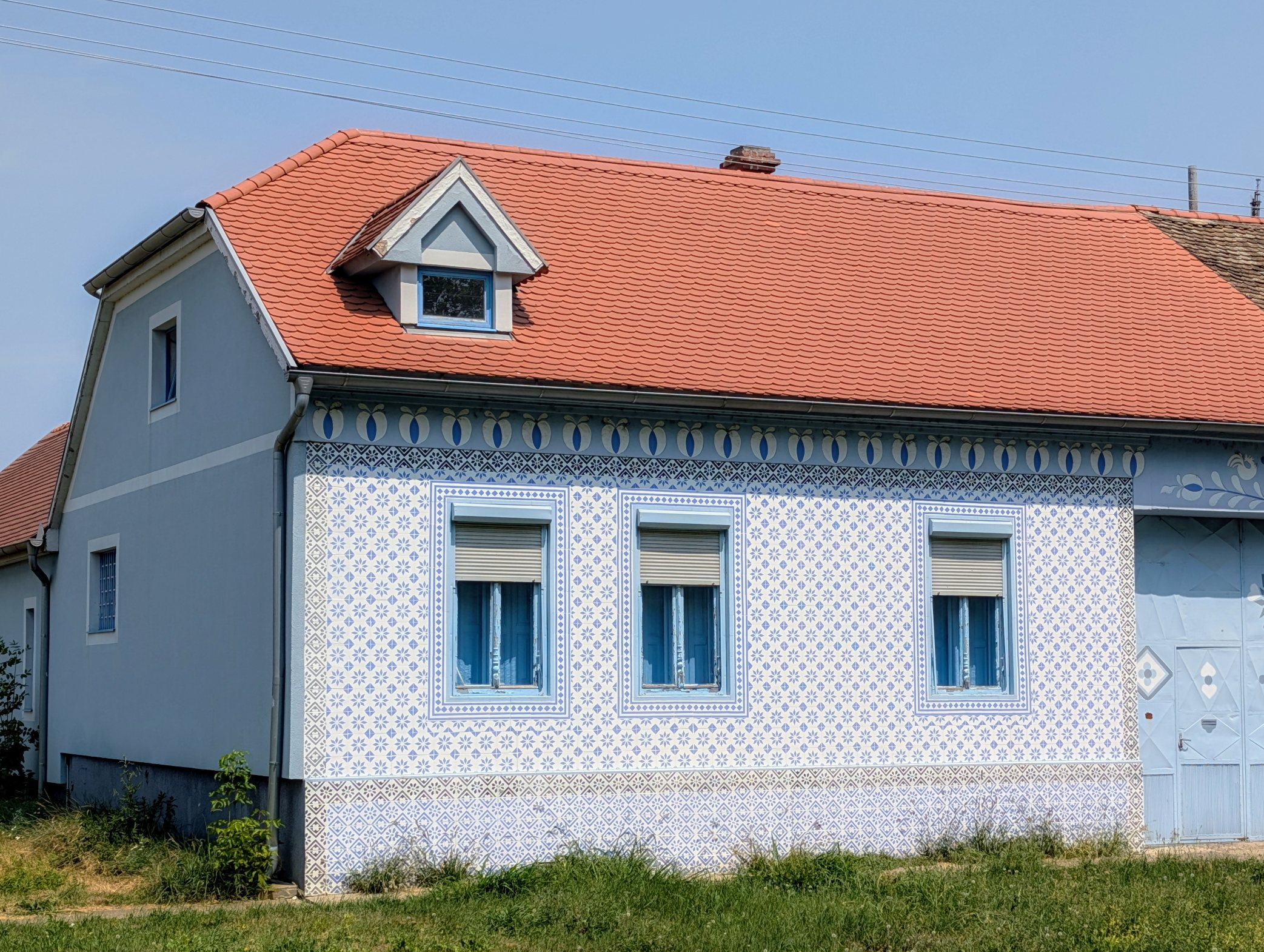
Memorial House of Martin Jonaš in Kovačica

Martin Jonaš's memorial house opened in Kovačica in 2014, on the 90th anniversary of his birth. Jonaš's house is a unique documentary about his life, covered with photographs, diplomas, and medals. The collection also includes paintings and historical materials related to the culture of Slovaks in Vojvodina.
