= Uzdin =

Uzdin Уздин (Serbian) Uzdâni (Romanian)
- Village (Selo)
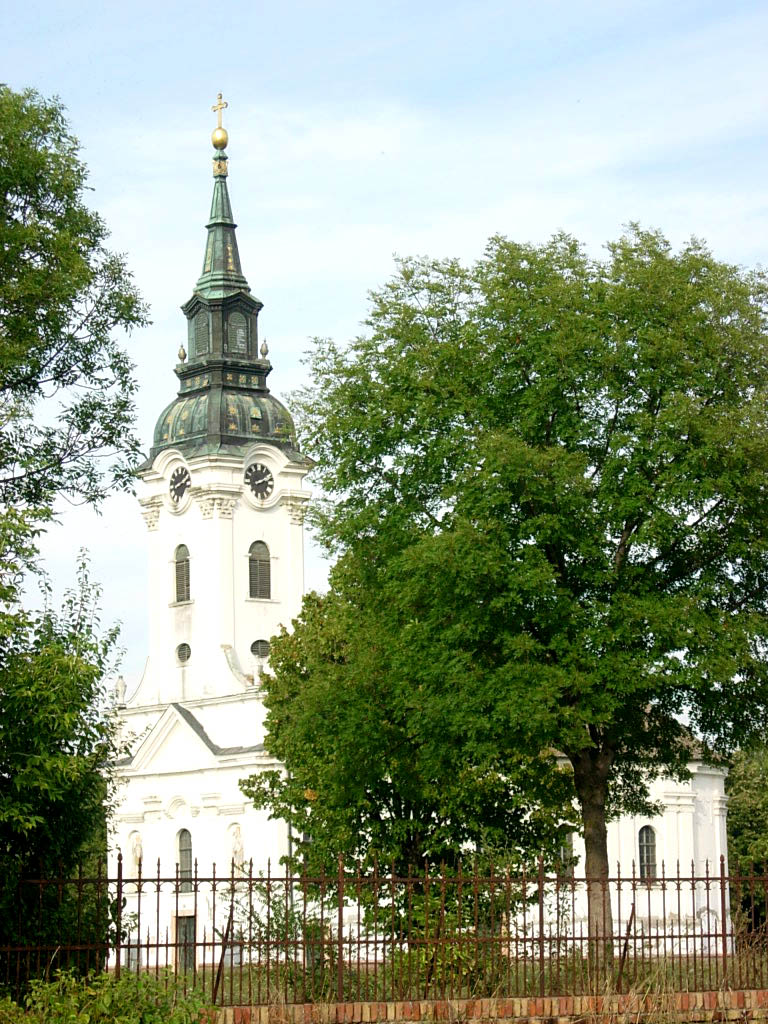
- The Romanian Orthodox Church of Saint George

- Location of Uzdin within Serbia Uzdin (Serbia) Uzdin (Europe)
- Coordinates: 45°12′10″N 20°37′07″E
- Country: Serbia
- Province: Vojvodina
- District: South Banat
- Municipality: Kovačica

Area
  - Uzdin: 7,136 km^{2} (2,755 sq mi)
- Elevation: 70 m (230 ft)

Population (2022)
  - Uzdin: 1,628
  - Density: 2,843/km^{2} (7,360/sq mi)
- Time zone: UTC+1 (CET)
  - Summer (DST): UTC+2 (CEST)
- Postal code: 26216
- Area code: +381(0)13
- Car plates: PA

Uzdin (Serbian Cyrillic: Уздин, Romanian: Uzdâni) is a village located in the Kovačica municipality, South Banat District, Vojvodina, Serbia. It is situated in the autonomous province of Vojvodina. The village has a population of 1,628 (2022 census) spread over 71,36km^{2} of land.

At the turn of the 20th century, its population was approximately 7000. The dramatic decrease is consistent with the decrease of the Romanian population throughout Vojvodina, reflecting emigration and low natality. Each year, the village loses about 2,2% of its inhabitants.

== Demographics ==
=== Historical population ===
- 1961: 4,593
- 1971: 4,202
- 1981: 3,885
- 1991: 3,099
- 2002: 2,498
- 2011: 2,029
- 2022: 1,628

=== Ethnic groups ===
According to data from the 2022 census, ethnic groups in the village include:

- 1,132 (69.5%) Romanians
- 305 (18.7%) Serbs
- 96 (5.9%) Roma
- Others/Undeclared/Unknown

== Culture and society ==
Uzdin is famous as a center for the cultural activities of Romanians in Serbia, including naive painting, the table tennis Club "Unirea", the publication of the newspaper Tibiscus and other literature, as well as the nurturing of Romanian folk music and dance and the hosting of music festivals.

The Gallery of Naive Art in Uzdin was established in 1963. Its first members were mostly women artists, creating paintings inspired by Romanian folklore. The gallery now hosts a permanent exhibition of about 100 local artworks.

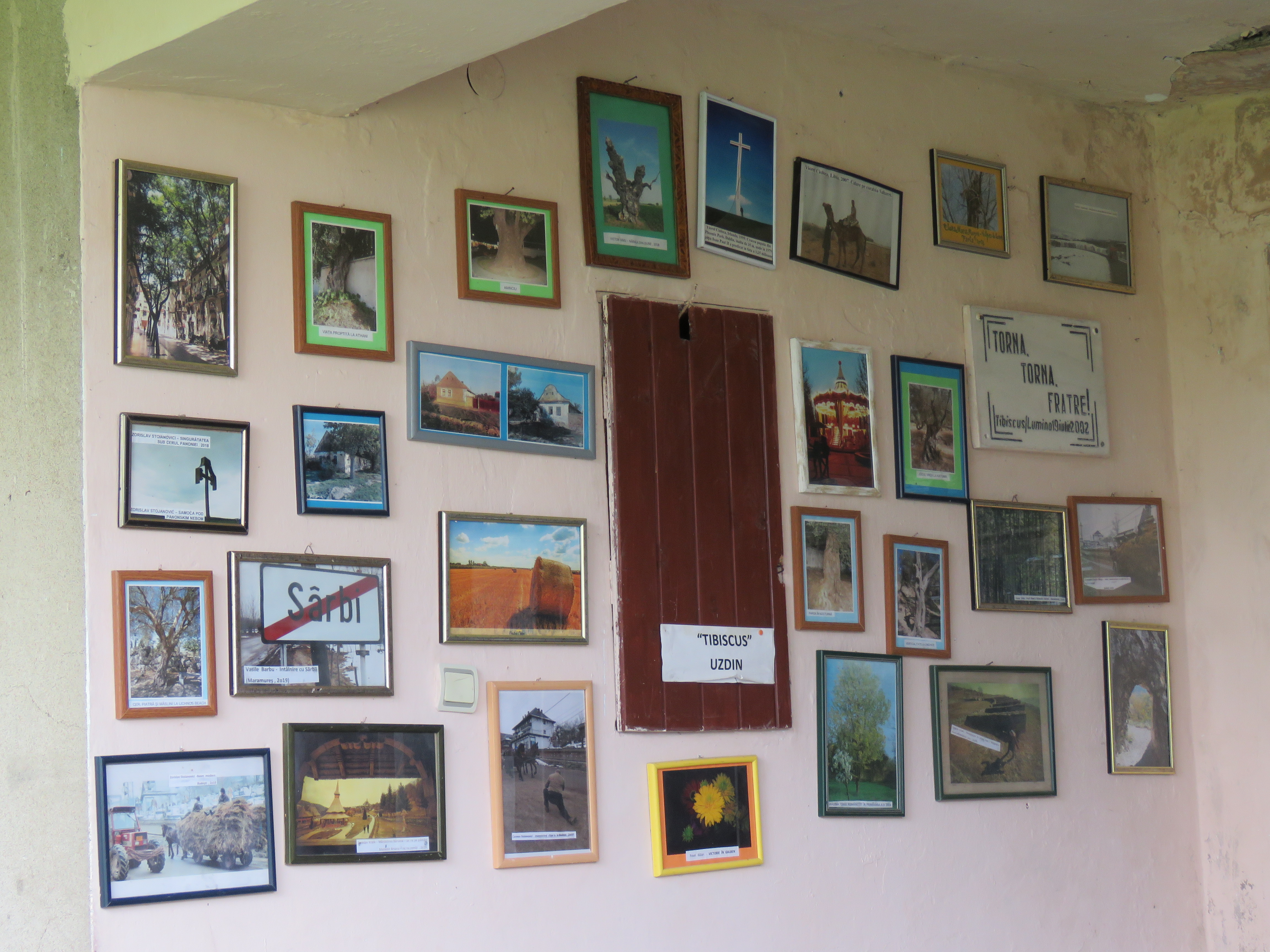
Romanian Ethno House in Uzdin

Uzdin Romanian Ethno House was founded to preserve the town's culture and tradition. It displays an ethnic exhibition with hundreds of items, including old agricultural tools, costumes, photographs, and paintings. The house also includes Library Petru Mezin with over 4.000 books in its fund and museum room Sports in Uzdin through Centuries.

Uzdin features a bust of Romania's national poet Mihai Eminescu, erected by Romanian sculptor Florin Musta.

=== Saint George Romanian Orthodox Church ===
Romanian Orthodoxy is the most prevalent form of religion in Uzdin. The Romanian Orthodox Church of Saint George was built in 1801. The iconostasis was painted by Konstantin Danil, between 1833 and 1836, and represents the largest display of his religious work. The church has the status of a cultural monument of exceptional significance.

== Education ==
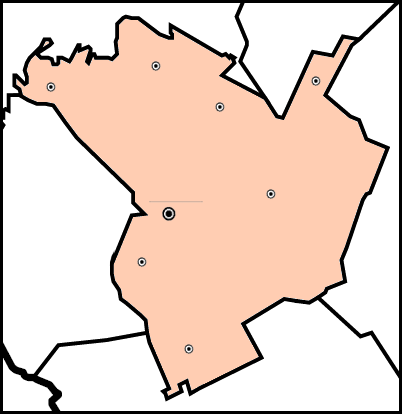

The first documents related to education in Uzdin date back from 1775, when about 30 students attended primary school. It moved to the present building in 1976. The school now has about 200 students of various ethnicities, and provides instruction in Romanian and Serbian languages.
