= Samoš =

Samoš Самош
- Village (Selo)
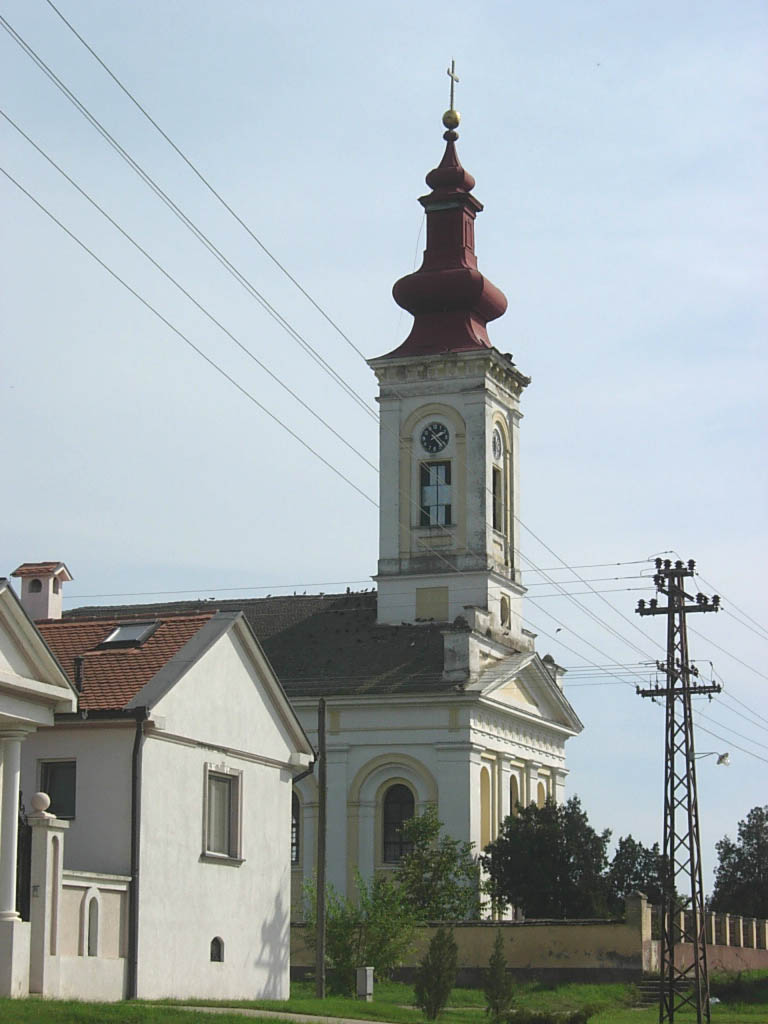
- The Orthodox Church

- Location of Samoš within Serbia Samoš (Serbia) Samoš (Europe)
- Coordinates: 45°12′08″N 20°46′12″E
- Country: Serbia
- Province: Vojvodina
- District: South Banat
- Municipality: Kovačica
- Elevation: 89 m (292 ft)

Population (2002)
  - Samoš: 1,247
- Time zone: UTC+1 (CET)
  - Summer (DST): UTC+2 (CEST)
- Postal code: 26350
- Area code: +381(0)13
- Car plates: PA

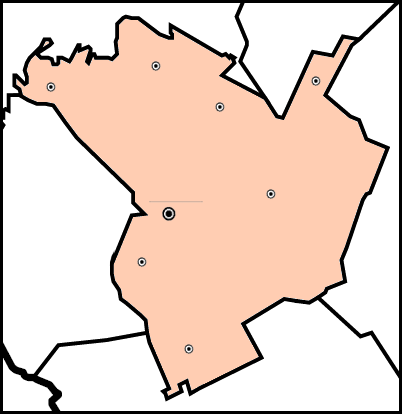

Samoš (Serbian Cyrillic: Самош) is a village in Serbia. It is situated in the Kovačica municipality, in the South Banat District, Vojvodina province. The village has a Serb ethnic majority (89.73%) and its population numbering 1,247 people (2002 census).

== Name ==
In Serbian the village is known as Samoš (Самош), in Hungarian as Számos, in Romanian as Samoș, and in German as Samosch.

== Historical population ==
- 1961: 2,310
- 1971: 2,108
- 1981: 1,658
- 1991: 1,438

== See also ==
- List of places in Serbia
- List of cities, towns and villages in Vojvodina
