= Church of St. Nicholas, Bačinci =

Church in Vojvodina, Serbia

Church of St. Nicholas
- Crkva svetog Nikole; Црква светог Николе
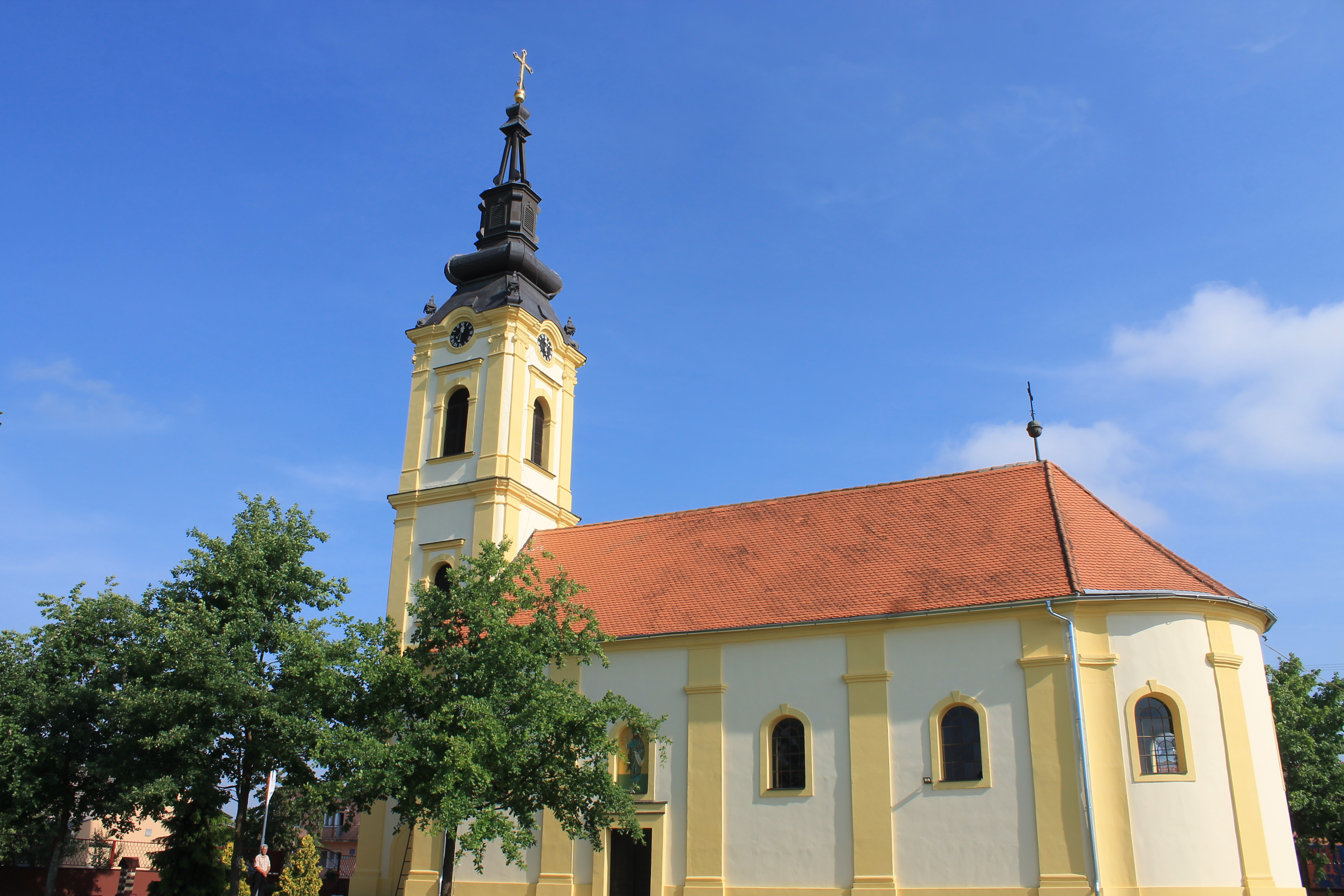
- Church of St Nicholas

- Shown within Vojvodina/Serbia Church of St. Nicholas (Serbia)
- 45°04′54″N 19°18′31″E
- Location: Bačinci, Vojvodina

Cultural Heritage of Serbia
- Type: Cultural Monument of Great Importance
- Designated: 30 December 1997
- Reference no.: СК 1346
- Country: Serbia
- Denomination: Serbian Orthodox

History
- Status: Church
- Dedication: Saint Nicholas

Architecture
- Functional status: Active
- Style: Neo-classicism
- Years built: 1805

Administration
- Archdiocese: Eparchy of Syrmia

Church of St. Nicholas (Serbian: Црква светог Николе) in Bačinci is a Serbian Orthodox church in Vojvodina, Serbia, dedicated to Saint Nicholas. The church was constructed in 1805 at the site of an older church which was destroyed in 1760. The iconostasis carving was done in 1826 by Marko Konstantinović while the painted decoration from 1831 is the work of Konstantin Pantelić. The Institute for the Protection of Cultural Monuments of Sremska Mitrovica adopted the initial decision on protection (no. 127) of 5 June 1967 while the building was listed as a protected cultural heritage of Serbia in 1997.

== See also ==
- Eparchy of Syrmia
