= Debeljača =

Debeljača Дебељача (Serbian) Torontálvásárhely (Hungarian)
- town
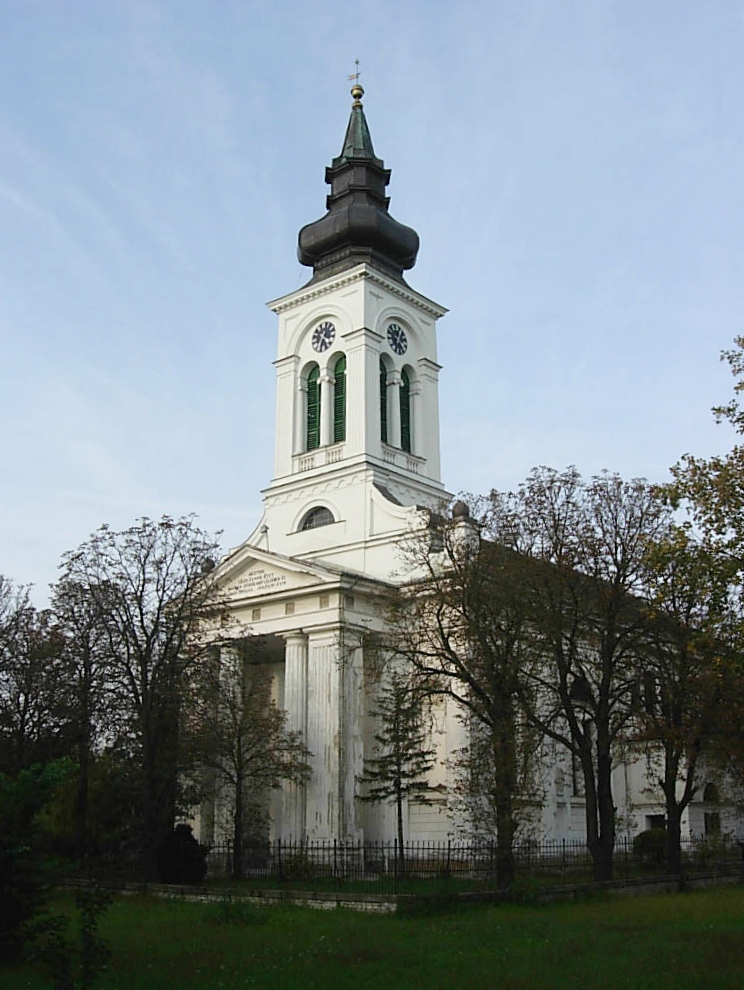
- The Calvinist Church

- Location of Debeljača within Serbia Debeljača (Serbia) Debeljača (Europe)
- Coordinates: 45°04′10″N 20°36′00″E
- Country: Serbia
- Province: Vojvodina
- District: South Banat
- Municipality: Kovačica
- Elevation: 75 m (246 ft)

Population (2022)
  - Debeljača: 3,747
- Time zone: UTC+1 (CET)
  - Summer (DST): UTC+2 (CEST)
- Postal code: 26214
- Area code: +381(0)13
- Car plates: PA

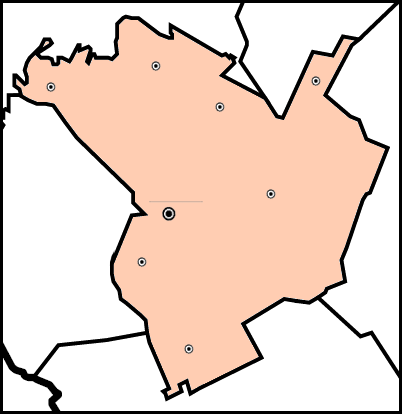

Debeljača (Serbian Cyrillic: Дебељача, pronounced [dɛbɛ̌ʎat͡ʃa]; Hungarian: Torontálvásárhely) is a town in Serbia. It is situated in the Kovačica municipality, in the South Banat District, Vojvodina province. According to the 2022 census, the town had 3727 inhabitants.

== History ==
After the end of the armed conflicts, a significant portion of the Hungarian population returned to the settlement, forming a new ethnic structure with the local inhabitants. Since then, Debeljača has been home to the largest number of Hungarians, followed by Serbs and other ethnic groups. Following the conflicts in the autumn of 1849, the original inhabitants returned and rebuilt their homesteads. The Debeljača was where the command of the German Banat Border Regiment was established, marking the rapid development of the area. By the decision of the Ministry of War on July 25, 1862, the place was elevated to the level of a market town and granted the right to hold a weekly market. Monday was designated as market day. After 11 years, on February 26, 1873, Debeljača gained the right to hold annual large fairs and the status of a town. The name Debeljača was changed to Torontálvásárhely. This name was retained until the Banat entered the newly formed kingdom SHS, when it became Debeljača once again. In the 21st century, alongside the name Debeljača, Torontálvásárhely (Hungarian: Torontálvásárhely) is reintroduced as the official Hungarian name of the place.

Until January 1, 1965, Debeljača was an independent municipality which also included the villages of Idvor and Sakule.

== Ethnic groups ==
The town has a Hungarian ethnic majority and its population numbering 3,727 people (2022 census).

- Hungarians = 1,506 (40.4%)
- Serbs = 1,471 (39.4%)
- Roma = 170 (4.5%)
- Others/Undeclared/Unknown

== Historical population ==
- 1961: 6,789
- 1971: 6,413
- 1981: 6,413
- 1991: 5,734
- 2002: 5,325
- 2011: 4,910
- 2022: 3,727

== See also ==
- List of places in Serbia
- List of cities, towns and villages in Vojvodina
