= Zuzana Chalupová =

- Зузана Халупова
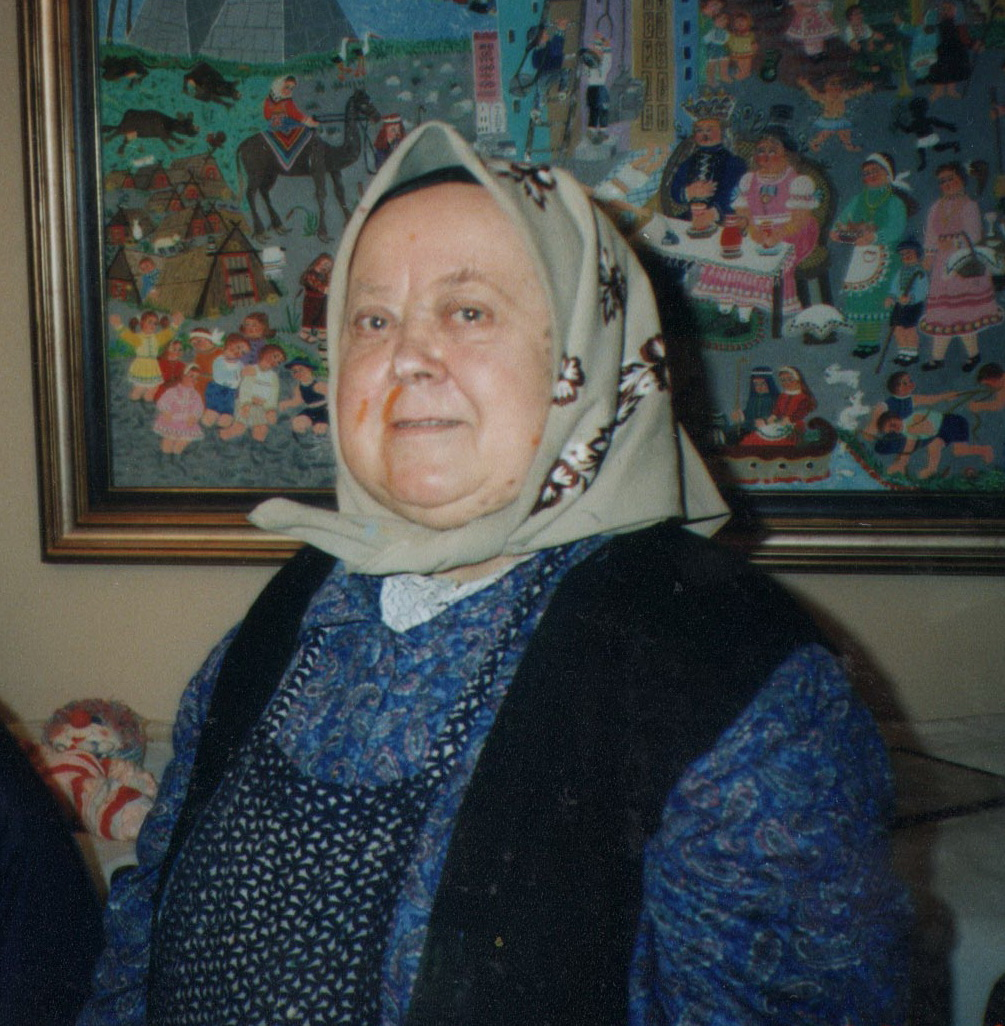
- Chalupová in 2001
- Born: 5 February 1925; Kovačica, Kingdom of Serbs, Croats and Slovenes
- Died: 1 August 2001 (aged 76); Belgrade, Serbia, FR Yugoslavia
- Known for: naive painting

Zuzana Chalupová: Playing in the Snow (1977). Oil on canvas, Gallery of Naive Art, Kovačica.

Zuzana Chalupová (Serbian: Зузана Халупова, romanized: Zuzana Halupova; 5 February 1925 – 1 August 2001) was a Serbian naïve painter of Slovak ethnicity, who was born and lived her whole life in the town of Kovačica, Serbia. Her colourful naive-style paintings recall children's works and fairy-tale illustrations. She typically painted children, so she was called "Mama Zuzana with a thousand children".

== Biography ==
Chalupová finished only five grades of elementary school. In the 1950s she began making scarves, shirts, and tapestries with traditional motifs. After earning some money from selling tapestries, she bought oil paint and started painting on canvas. She painted her first oil on canvas painting named Mlaćenje konoplja (Hemp Beating) in 1964. She enjoyed imminent success. She exhibited her paintings in the Museum of Naive Arts in Svetozarevo and in Kovačica during the "Kovačički oktobar" festival.

Her first solo exhibition was in 1968 in Dubrovnik where all of the paintings were bought by foreign collectors. Over the following three decades, Chalupová exhibited her works worldwide (France, Germany, Switzerland, USA, England, Japan, and elsewhere).

== Work and legacy ==
Though she never had children of her own, the most frequent motif in Chalupová's paintings were children. Even adults (some with moustaches) look like children in her paintings. Her other frequent motifs are winter, Kovačica church, and biblical themes.

Chalupová made many paintings for charity purposes. She painted a monumental painting for the International Committee of the Red Cross depicting children with the members of the Red Cross. In 1978, she made a painting named Zaštitimo spomenike kulture (Let's Protect the Cultural Heritage!) for the Institute for the Protection of Cultural Monuments of Serbia. The painting depicts Gračanica monastery, statue of Pobednik, Serbian Orthodox priests with children in Slovak traditional costumes and God watching all this from the skies. In 1974, Chalupová made a painting for the UNICEF headquarters named Children of the UN, full of symbols: It depicts the Earth, UNICEF headquarters, and the Statue of Liberty surrounded by children and angels with olive branches. The same year, her painting Zima (Winter) was printed by UNICEF Christmas card program in two million copies.

Her creative legacy consists of more than 1,000 paintings. Many of her paintings are on permanent display in Kovačica's Gallery of Naive Art. For her achievements, Matica slovenská decorated Chalupová with the order of Cyril and Methodius.

Part of the Gallery of Naive Art in Kovačica dedicated to Zuzana Chalupová

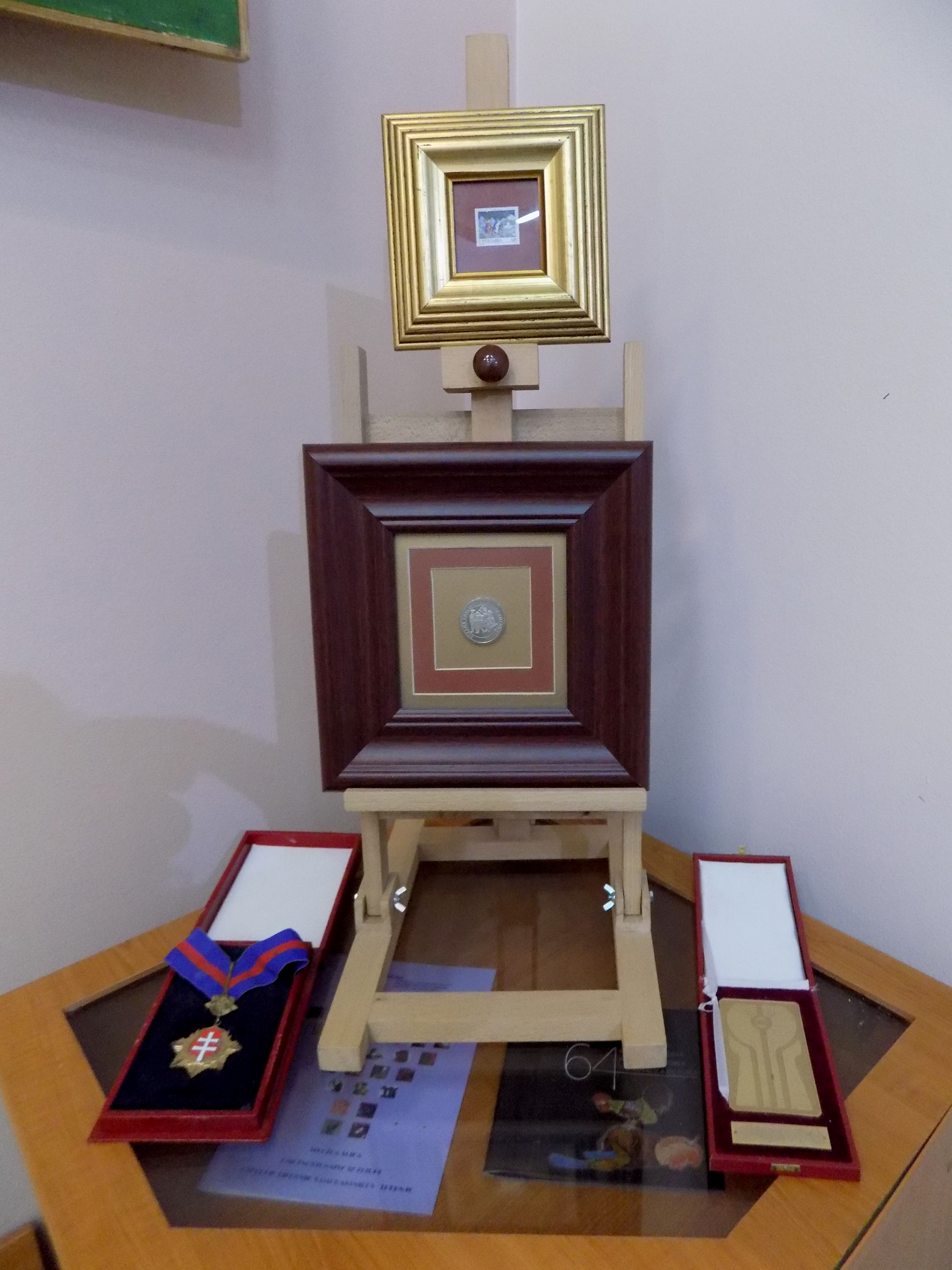
Awards given to Zuzana Chalupová

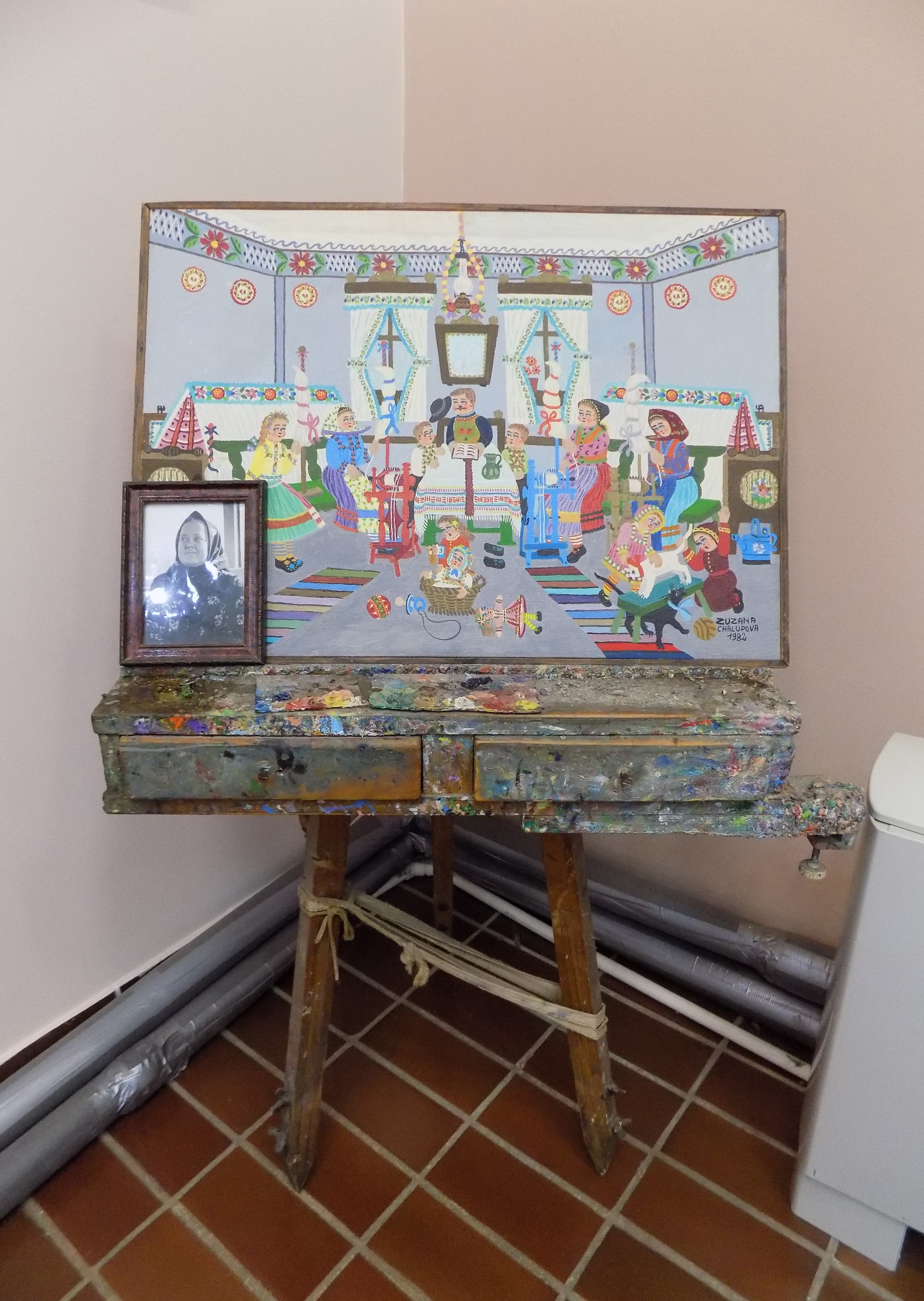
Easel of Zuzana Chalupová

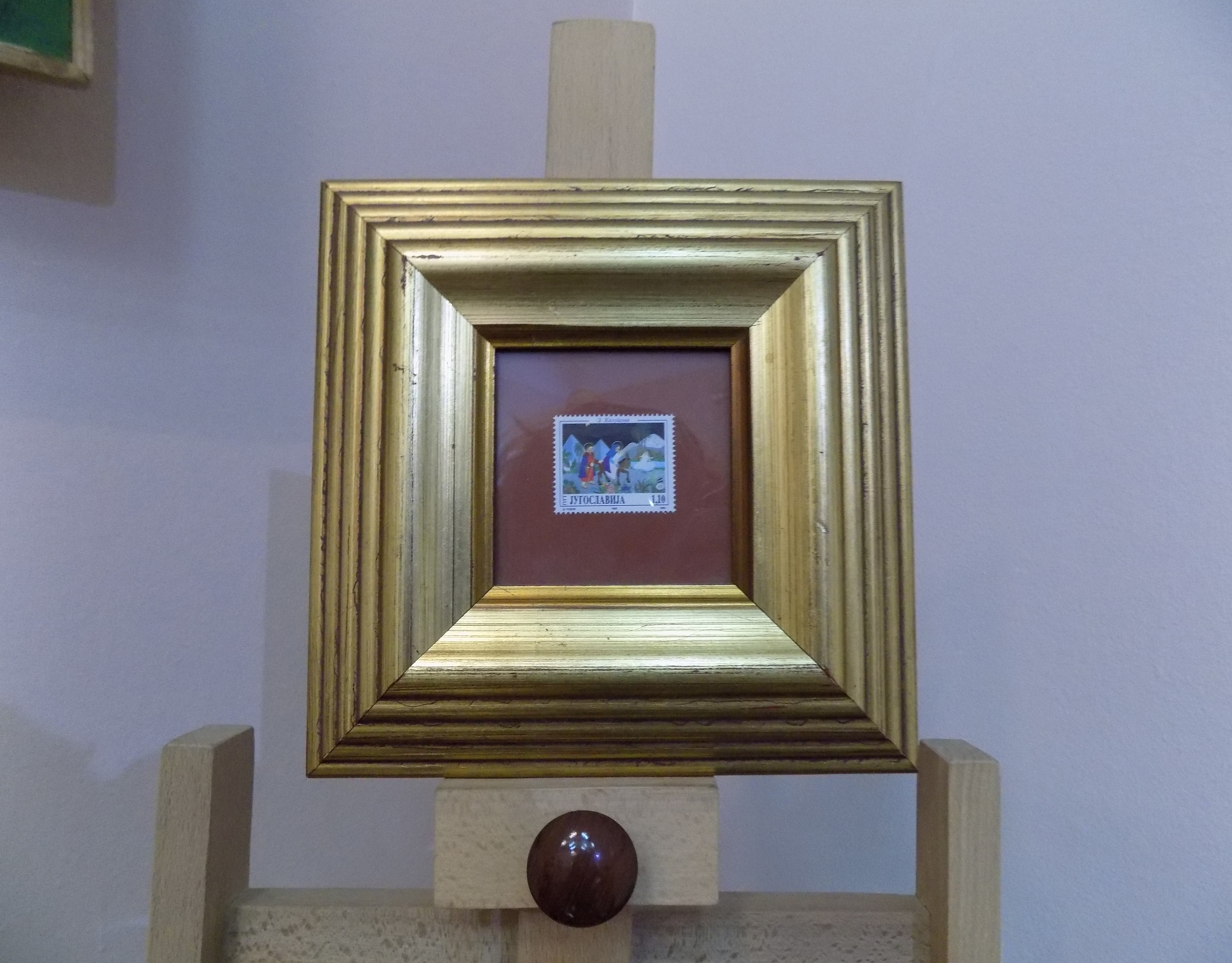
Painting by Zuzana Chalupová on Postage Stamp
