= Putnikovo =

Putnikovo Путниково
- Village (Selo)
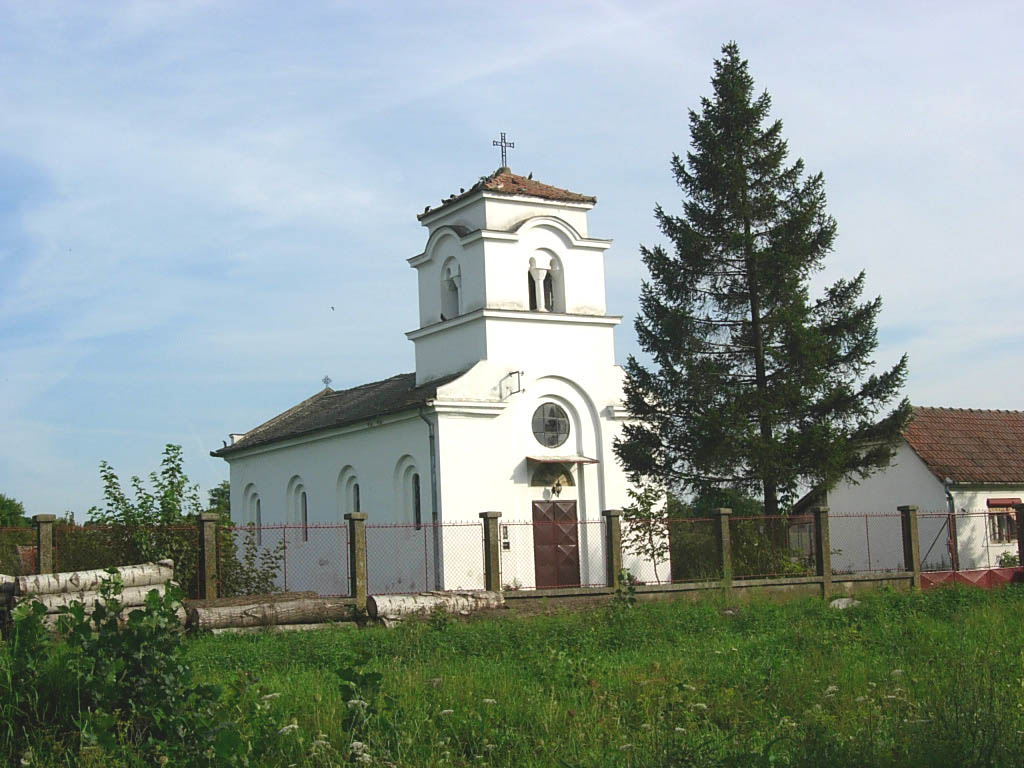
- The Orthodox Church

- Location of Putnikovo within Serbia Putnikovo (Serbia) Putnikovo (Europe)
- Coordinates: 45°11′29″N 20°39′18″E
- Country: Serbia
- Province: Vojvodina
- District: South Banat
- Municipality: Kovačica
- Elevation: 77 m (253 ft)

Population (2002)
  - Putnikovo: 243
- Time zone: UTC+1 (CET)
  - Summer (DST): UTC+2 (CEST)
- Area code: +381(0)13
- Car plates: PA

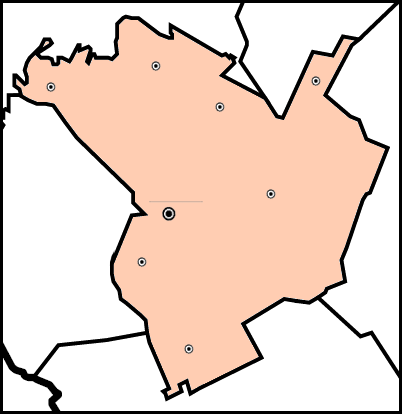

Putnikovo (Serbian Cyrillic: Путниково) is a village in Serbia. It is situated in the Kovačica municipality, in the South Banat District, Vojvodina province. The village has a Serb ethnic majority (97.53%) and its population numbering 243 people (2002 census).

== Historical population ==
- 1961: 436
- 1971: 375
- 1981: 307
- 1991: 260

== See also ==
- List of places in Serbia
- List of cities, towns and villages in Vojvodina
