= Kovačica =

Kovačica Ковачица (Serbian) Kovačica (Slovak) Covăcița (Romanian) Antalfalva (Hungarian)
- Town and municipality
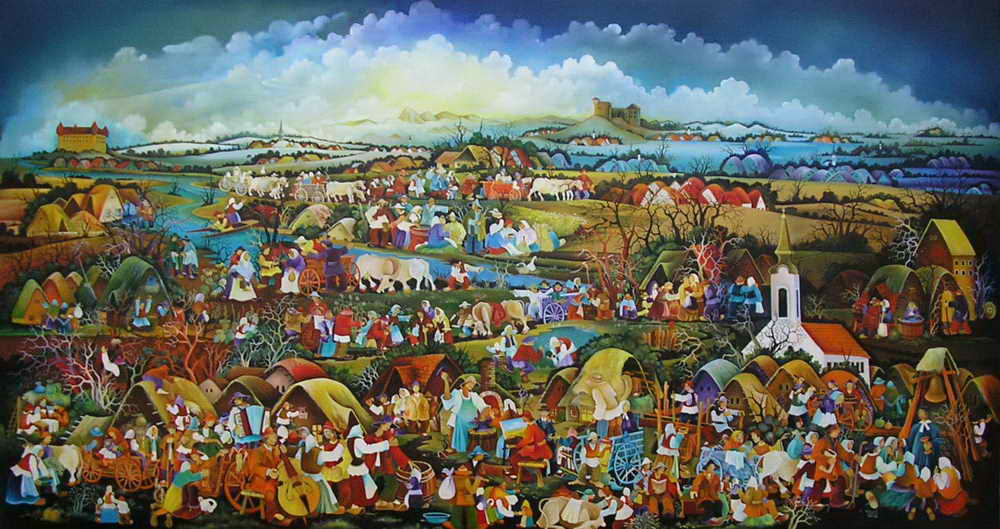
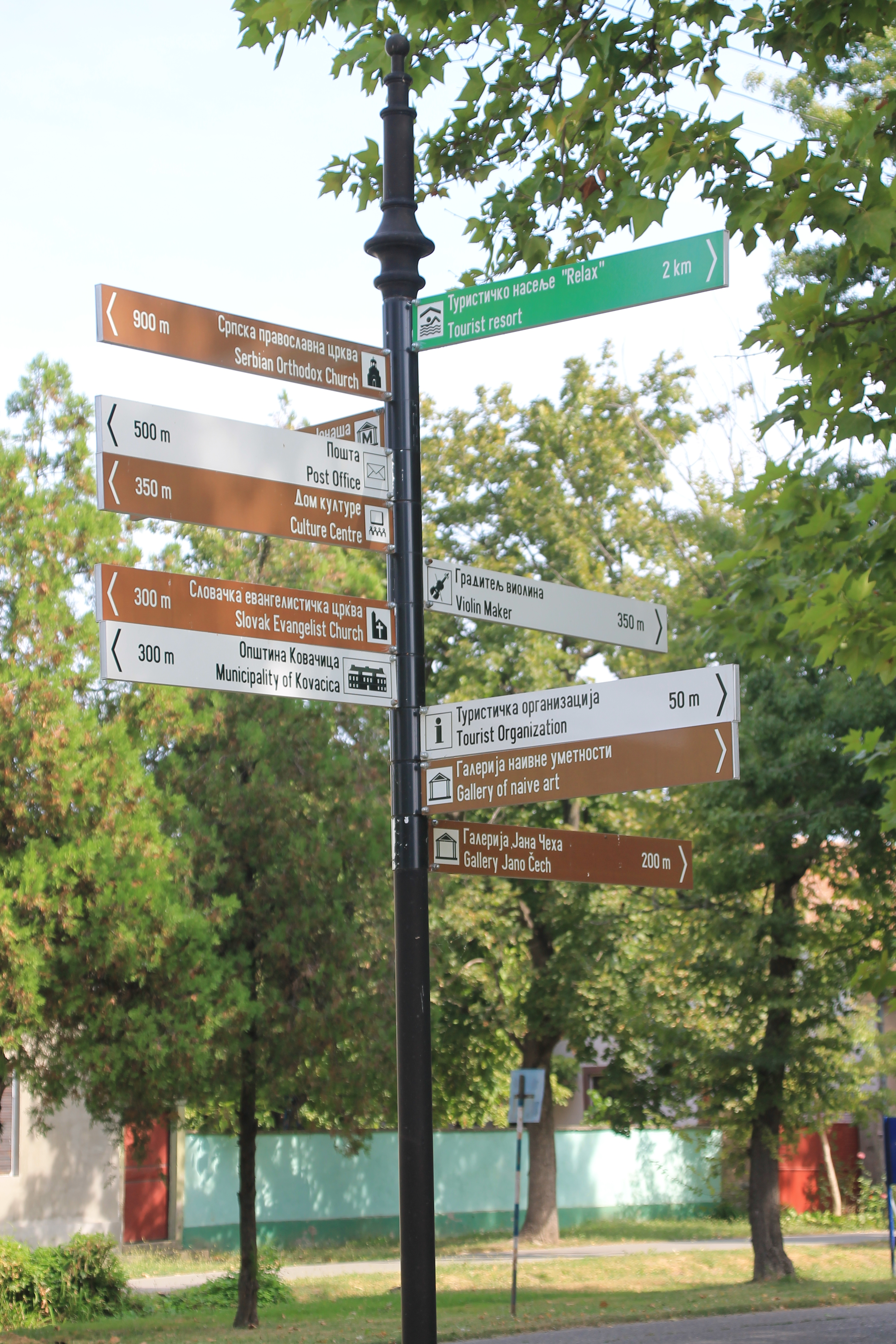
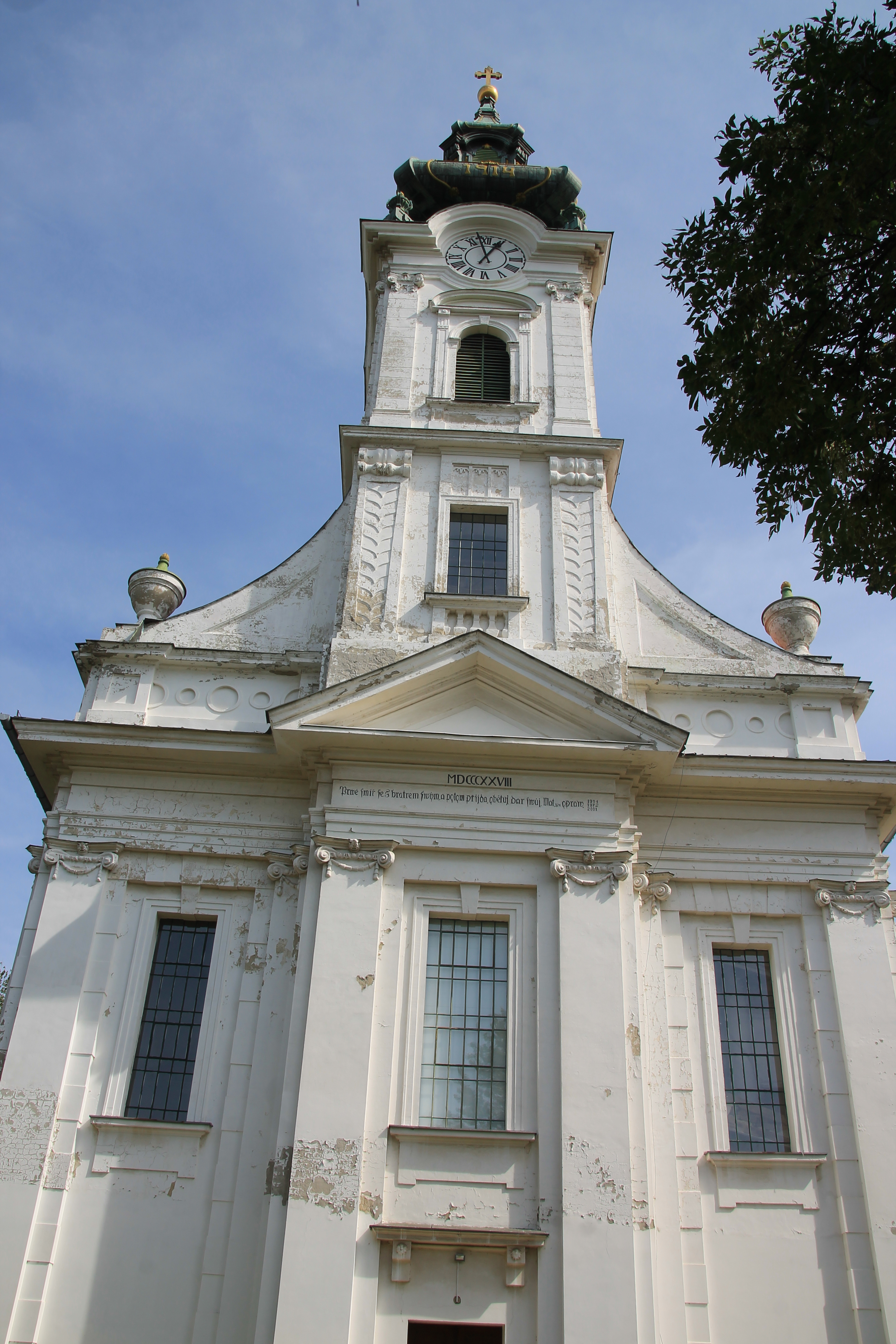
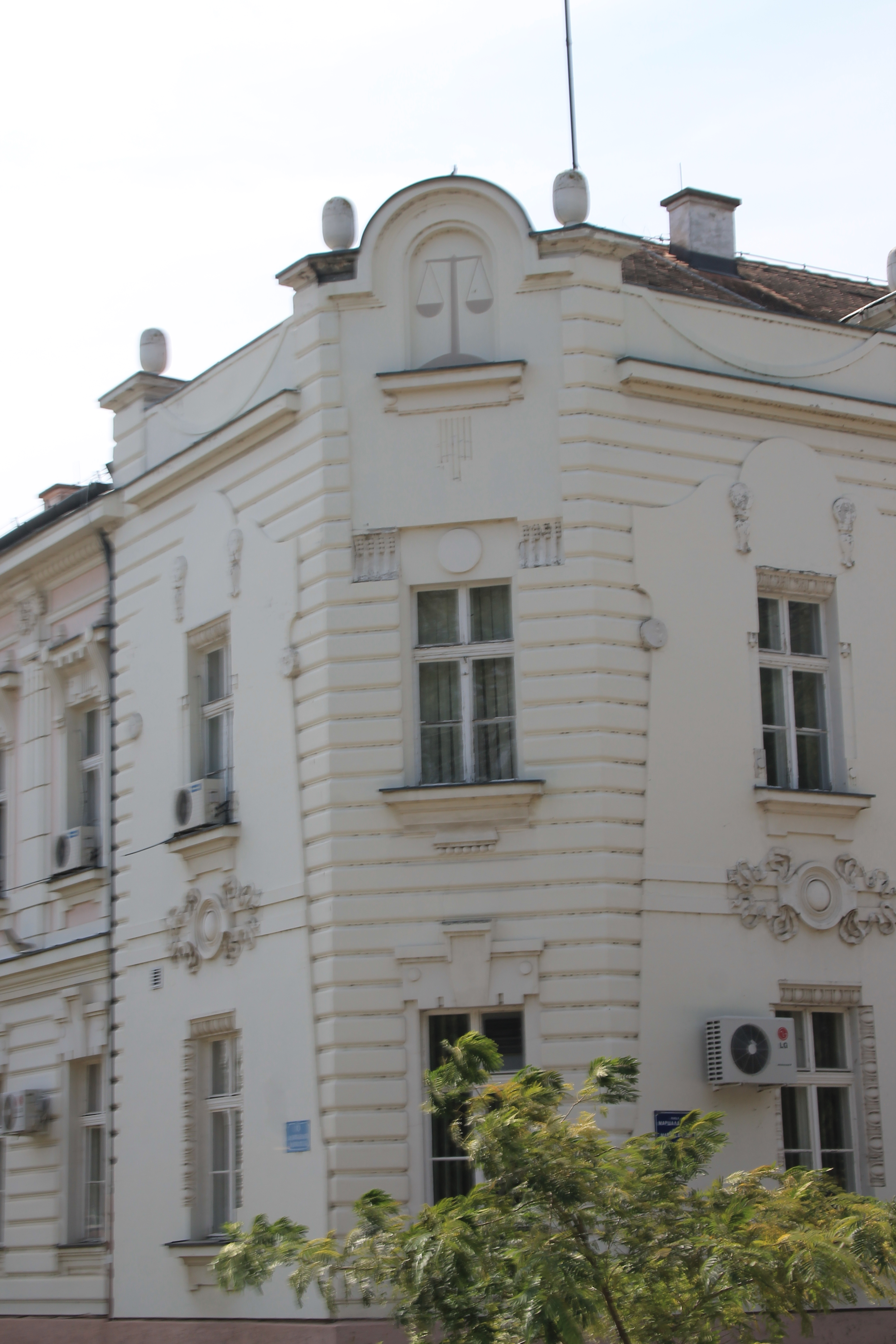
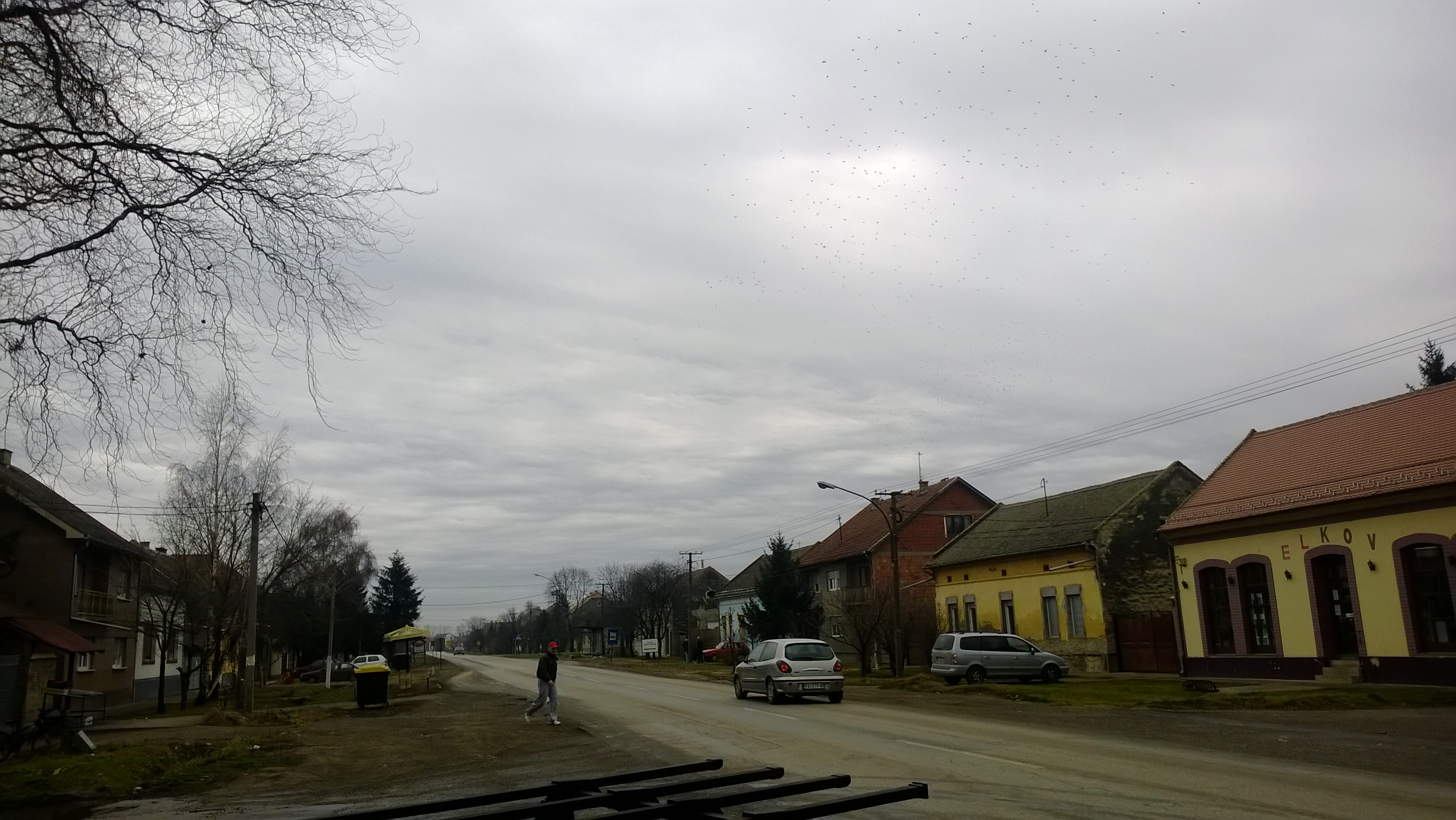
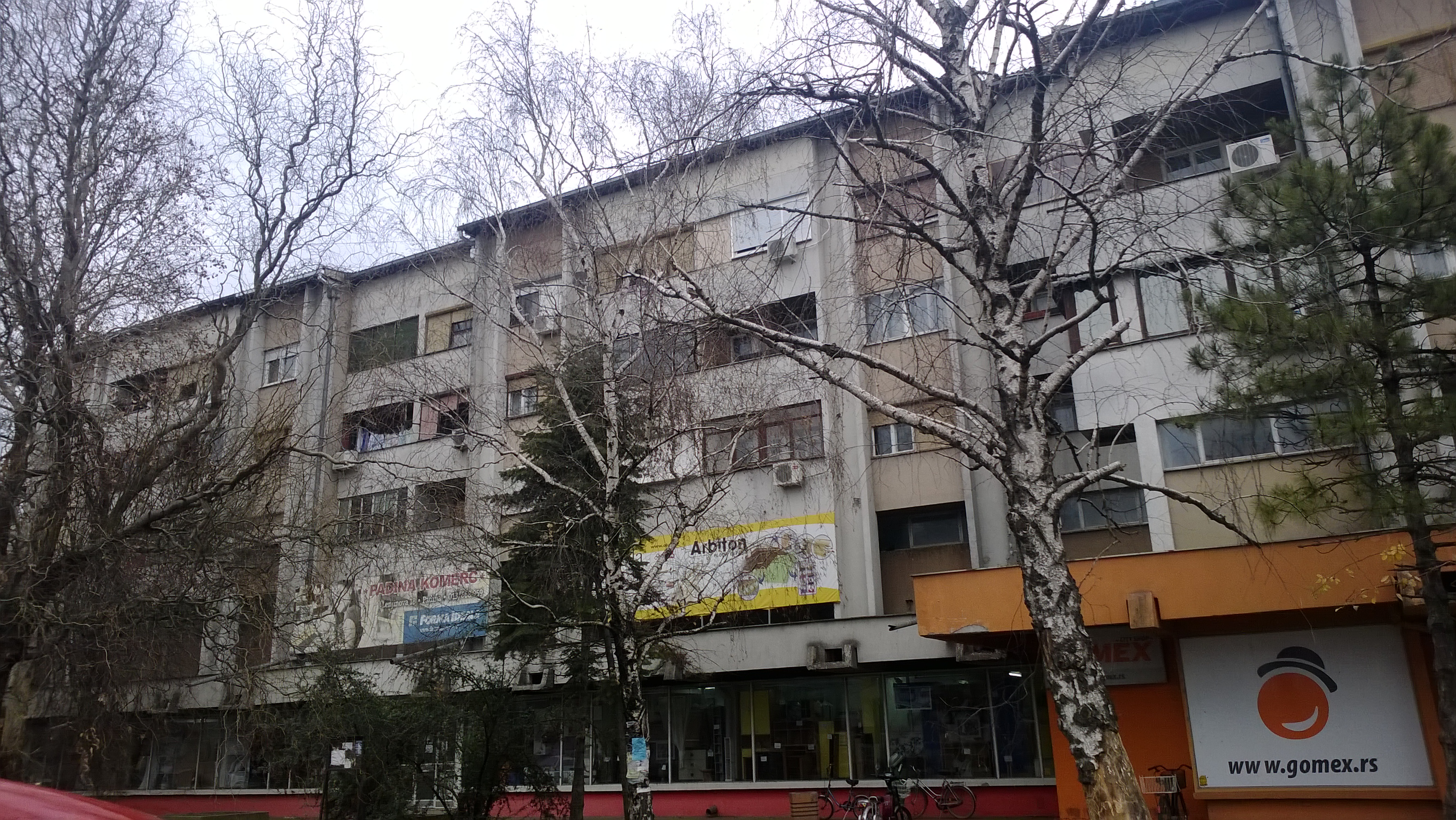
- Kovačica

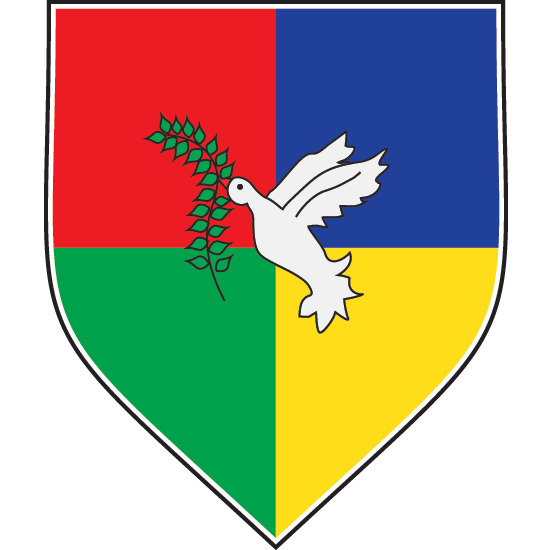
- Coat of arms

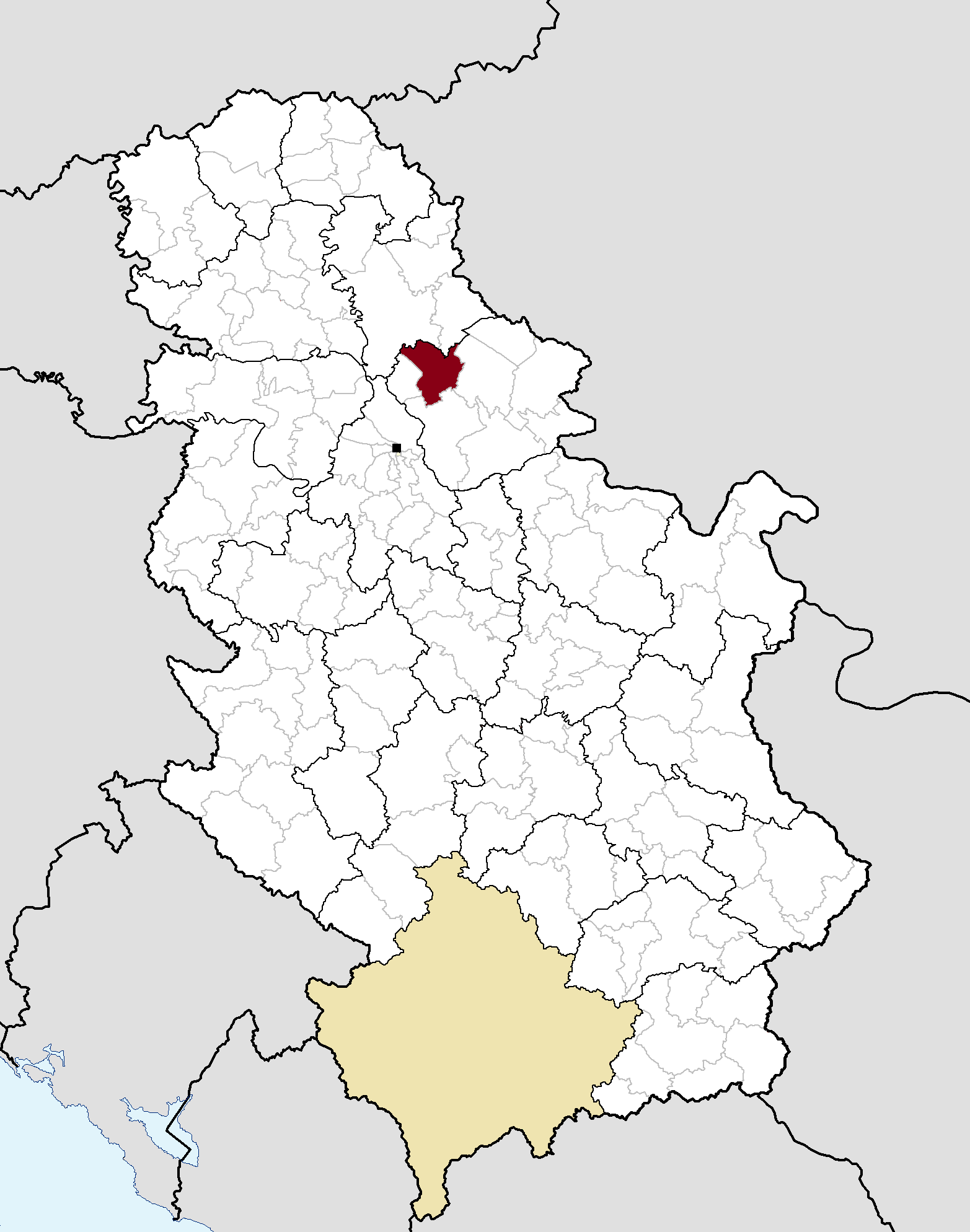
- Location of Kovačica within Serbia
- Coordinates: 45°6′42″N 20°37′17″E
- Country: Serbia
- Province: Vojvodina
- District: South Banat
- Settlements: 8

Government
  - Mayor: Petar Višnjički (SNS)

Area
  - Municipal: 419 km^{2} (162 sq mi)
- Elevation: 78 m (256 ft)

Population (2022)
  - Municipal: 21,178
  - Density: 50.5/km^{2} (131/sq mi)
  - Urban: 5,398
- Time zone: UTC+1 (CET)
  - Summer (DST): UTC+2 (CEST)
- Postal code: 26210
- Area code: +381(0)13
- Car plates: PA
- Official languages: Serbian together with Slovak, Romanian and Hungarian
- Website: www.kovacica.org

Kovačica (Serbian Cyrillic: Ковачица, pronounced [koʋǎtʃitsa]; Slovak: Kovačica; Hungarian: Antalfalva; Romanian: Covăcița) is a town and municipality located in the South Banat District, Vojvodina, Serbia. According to the 2022 census, the town has a population of 5,398, while the municipality has 21,178 inhabitants. It is widely known for its naïve art that the local residents make without any form of art school.

== Geography ==
The town of Kovačica is located 27km from Pančevo and 43km from Belgrade.

== History ==
The town was founded in the 18th century, but there are records of small settlements dating from 1458. In the middle of the 18th century, this area was recorded as a wasteland. Settlement was founded in 1750 and was settled (in 1751–1752) by Serb soldiers from Potisje and Pomorišje, after military frontier in these regions was abolished. In 1767, Kovačica was included into German regiment of Banat Military Frontier.

First Slovaks came here from Ečka and Aradac (in 1783) and after them, Slovaks from Arvas, Trenčin and Bekeš county came here as well (in 1801). From the middle of the 19th century, Kovačica is a center of municipality and cultural and social center of Slovaks in Banat.

The Slovak Evangelical Church in Kovačica was built between 1824-1828. The altar was painted in 1838-1839 by Konstantin Danil.

== Settlements ==
Kovačica municipality includes the town of Kovačica and the following villages:

- Crepaja
- Debeljača (Hungarian: Torontálvásárhely)
- Idvor
- Padina
- Putnikovo
- Samoš
- Uzdin
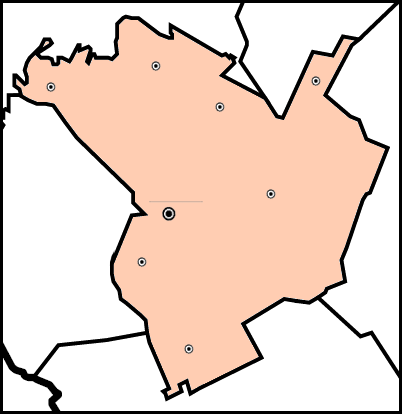

== Demographics ==
Historical population
| Year | Pop. | ±% p.a. |
|---|---|---|
| 1948 | 31,682 | — |
| 1953 | 32,808 | +0.70% |
| 1961 | 34,654 | +0.69% |
| 1971 | 33,489 | −0.34% |
| 1981 | 32,798 | −0.21% |
| 1991 | 30,469 | −0.73% |
| 2002 | 27,890 | −0.80% |
| 2011 | 25,274 | −1.09% |
| 2022 | 21,178 | −1.59% |

According to the 2022 census results, the municipality of Kovačica has 21,178 inhabitants.

=== Ethnic groups ===
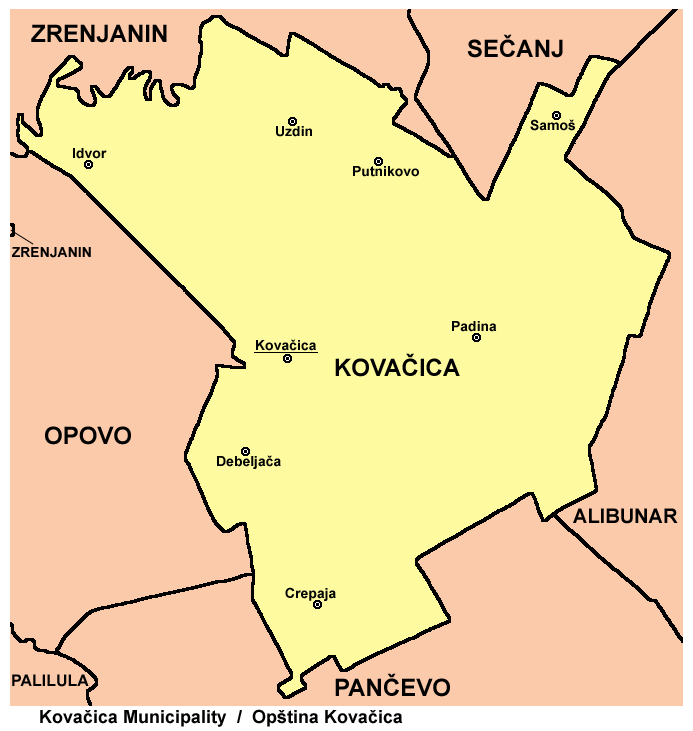
Map of Kovačica municipality

Communities with Slovak majorities are: Kovačica (Slovak: Kovačica) and Padina (Slovak: Padina). Communities with Serb majorities are: Crepaja, Idvor, Putnikovo and Samoš. There is one community with a Hungarian majority: Debeljača (Hungarian: Torontálvásárhely), and one community with a Romanian majority: Uzdin (Romanian: Uzdin).

The ethnic composition of the municipality:

| Ethnic group | Population | Share |
|---|---|---|
| Slovaks | 8,676 | 41% |
| Serbs | 7,249 | 34.2% |
| Hungarians | 1,597 | 7.5% |
| Romanians | 1,208 | 5.7% |
| Roma | 755 | 3.5% |
| Others/Undeclared/Unknown | 1,693 | 7.7% |

== Economy ==
The following table gives a preview of total number of employed people per their core activity (as of 2017):

| Activity | Total |
|---|---|
| Agriculture, forestry and fishing | 255 |
| Mining | - |
| Processing industry | 845 |
| Distribution of power, gas and water | 4 |
| Distribution of water and water waste management | 79 |
| Construction | 173 |
| Wholesale and retail, repair | 607 |
| Traffic, storage and communication | 127 |
| Hotels and restaurants | 81 |
| Media and telecommunications | 36 |
| Finance and insurance | 36 |
| Property stock and charter | - |
| Professional, scientific, innovative and technical activities | 89 |
| Administrative and other services | 132 |
| Administration and social assurance | 209 |
| Education | 372 |
| Healthcare and social work | 228 |
| Art, leisure and recreation | 57 |
| Other services | 54 |
| Total | 3,387 |

== Naïve art ==
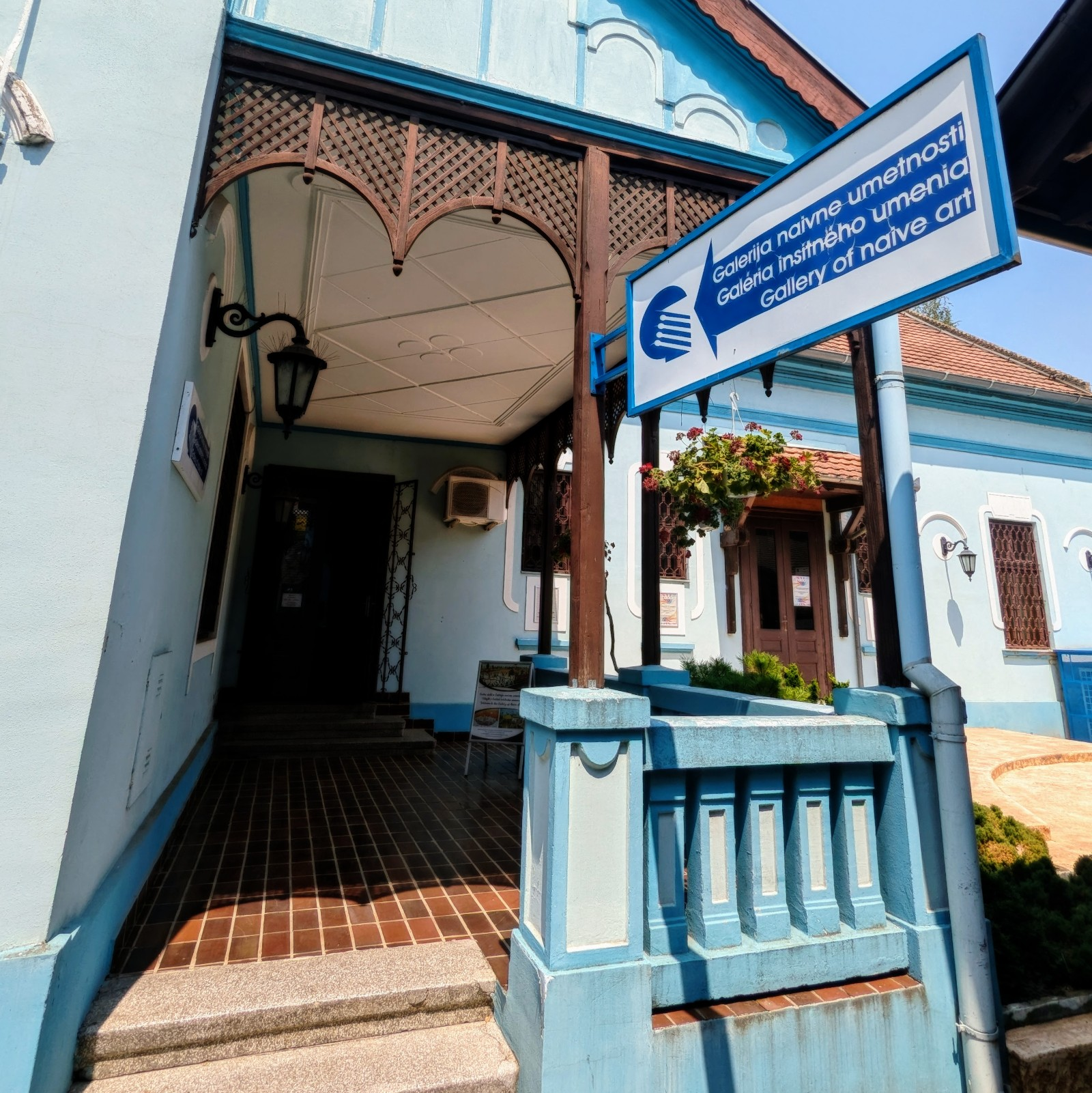
The Gallery of Naive Art in Kovačica

Kovačica is well known for the tradition of naïve art, originating from local Slovak painters. The Gallery of Naïve Art, founded in 1955, is a major tourist destination in the area. Its most notable representatives are Zuzana Chalupová, also known as Mama Zuzana, Martin Jonáš, Jan Knjazovic, Martin Paluška, Jan Sokol and Jan Venjarski. The gallery organizes various exhibitions and events, such as Kovačički oktobar (Kovačica October), and has a collection of over 800 paintings.

Kovačica's naïve painting is characterized by nostalgic, idyllic themes featuring life on the streets and in village yards, work in the fields of the golden Banat plain, and the ambience of country rooms with old carpets and objects. In December 2024, Kovačica's naïve art was recognized by UNESCO as an Intangible cultural heritage.

== International relations ==
=== Twin towns — Sister cities ===
Kovačica is twinned with:

- Banská Bystrica, Slovakia

== See also ==
- Municipalities of Serbia
- South Banat District
