= Banoštor =

Banoštor Баноштор (Serbian)
- Village (Selo)
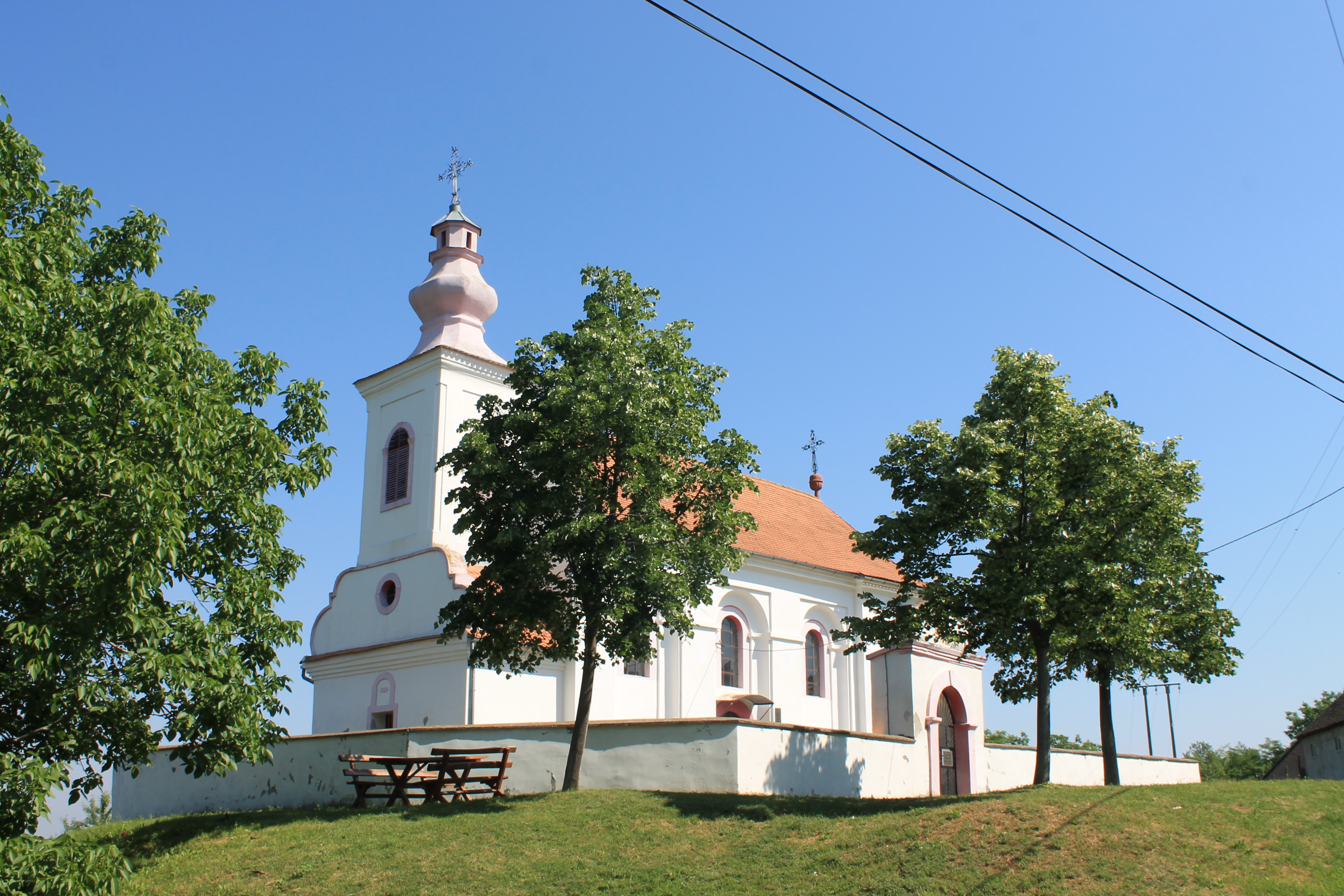
- Serbian Orthodox Church of St. George

- Location within Vojvodina Location within Serbia Location within Europe
- Coordinates: 45°13′N 19°37′E
- Country: Serbia
- Province: Vojvodina
- Region: Syrmia (Podunavlje)
- District: South Bačka
- Municipality: Beočin

Population (2022)
  - Total: 643
- Time zone: UTC+1 (CET)
  - Summer (DST): UTC+2 (CEST)

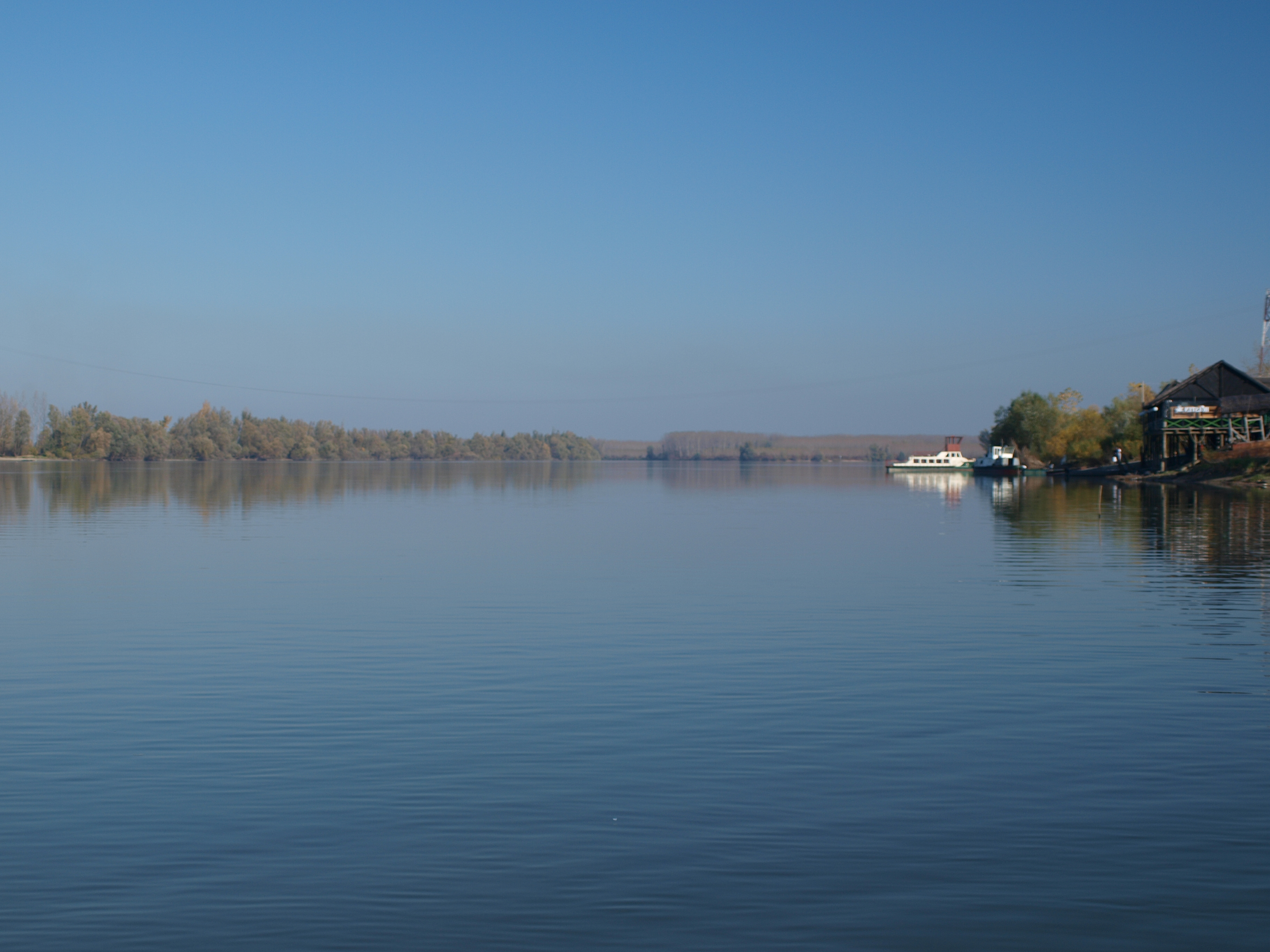
A river ferry on the Danube river in Banoštor.

Banoštor (Serbian Cyrillic: Баноштор) is a village in Serbia. It is situated in the Beočin municipality, in the Vojvodina province. Although the village is geographically located in Syrmia, it is part of the South Bačka District. The village has a Serb ethnic majority and its population numbering 643 people (2022 census).

== Name ==
The name Banoštor means "the monastery of the ban". It was named after a monastery that was founded at this location in the 12th century. The founder of a monastery was the son of the Serbian župan Uroš I, ban Beloš, who was a palatine of the Kingdom of Hungary, and who ruled over Srem from 1142 to 1163.

In Serbian, the village is known as Banoštor (Баноштор) and in Hungarian as Bánmonostor.

== History ==
Following the Gallic invasion of the Balkans in 279 BC, Celtic tribes settled throughout Serbia, their settlement at Banoštor was called Malata. It was later conquered by the Romans in 1st century BC and was renamed to Bononia. Romans transformed the settlement into a military stronghold with a Roman military unit based here known as Cohors Alpinorum.

The Roman legion named Herculia VI was also stationed in the town. Two religious altars were also situated near Bononia, one of them was dedicated to Jupiter and another one to Neptune.

Many Serbs from this area were executed in the Jasenovac Concentration Camp (1941–1945) by the Fascist Croatian regime of Ustashe who sided with Nazi Germany during the Second World War.

== Historical population ==
- 1921: 1,095
- 1931: 1,784
- 1948: 705
- 1953: 677
- 1961: 678
- 1971: 733
- 1981: 650
- 1991: 618
- 2002: 780
- 2011: 737
- 2022: 643

== Features ==
Banoštor is located on the edge of the Fruška Gora Mountain Range and on the Danube River. Every year around September, the village celebrates the beginning of the wine season with a grape festival called the "Dan Grožđa" or Grape Day and it is dedicated to Sveti Trifun (Saint Trifun), God's overseer of wine growers. The village's Serbian Orthodox Church was rebuilt in the early 19th century and is dedicated to Saint George.

== See also ==
- List of places in Serbia
- List of cities, towns and villages in Vojvodina
