= Church of the Epiphany of the Lord, Srbobran =

Church of the Epiphany of the Lord
- Српска православна црква у Србобрану
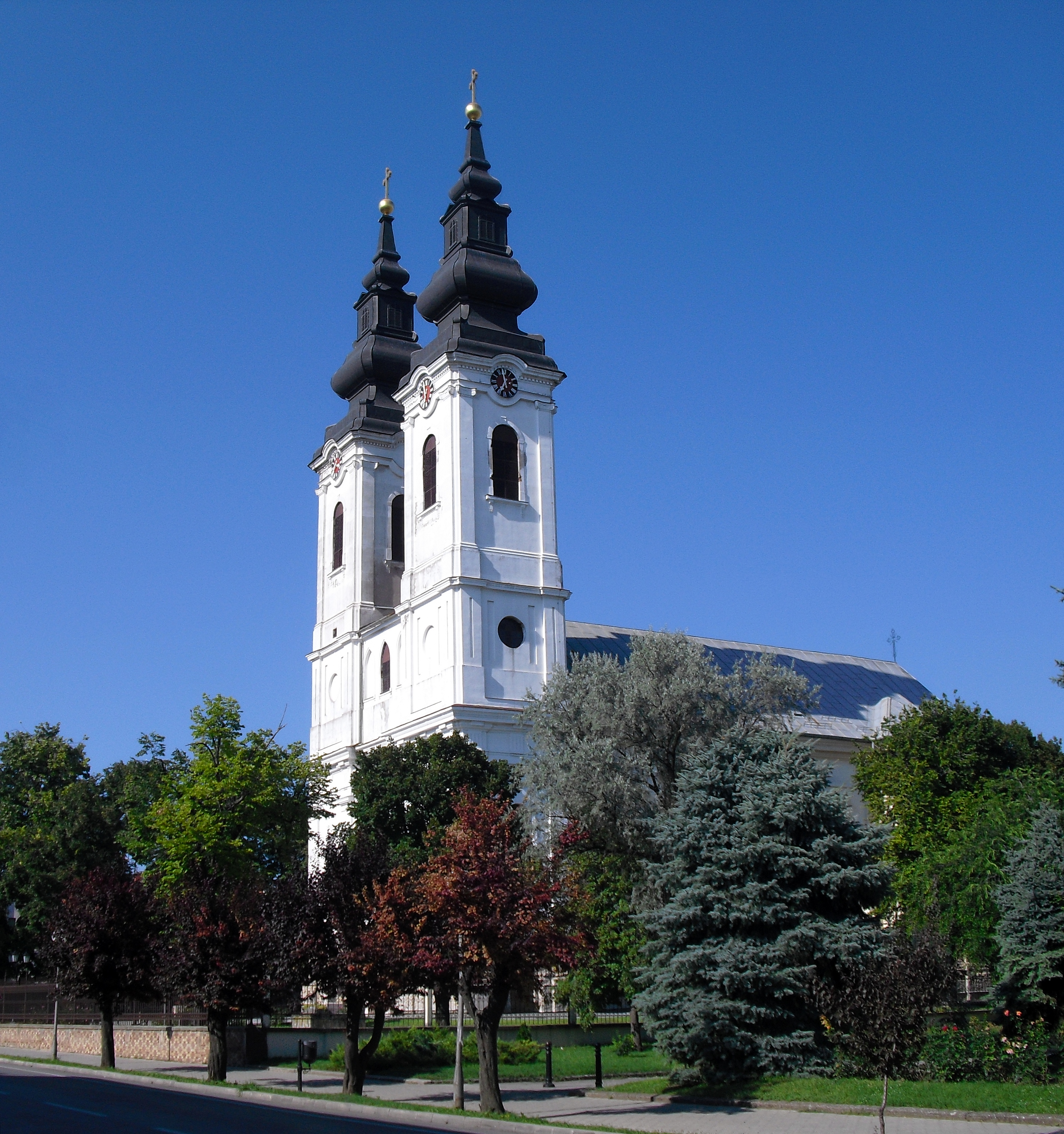
- Church of the Epiphany of the Lord
- 45°32′45″N 19°47′26″E
- Location: Srbobran, Vojvodina
- Country: Serbia
- Denomination: Serbian Orthodox

History
- Status: Church
- Dedication: Epiphany

Architecture
- Functional status: Active
- Style: Baroque

Administration
- Archdiocese: Eparchy of Bačka

Church of the Epiphany of the Lord (Serbian Cyrillic: Српска православна црква у Србобрану) is a Serbian Orthodox church in Srbobran, in Vojvodina, Serbia. The church was built between 1787 and 1807 and is today listed as a part of the Immovable Cultural Heritage of Great Importance. It was erected at the highest point in the town.

There is a folk belief about the patriotic symbolism in the architecture of the church with the two bell towers representing the Serbian people on both sides of the Sava and Danube rivers. The church building itself was consecrated in 1807 ahead of the completion of the final works for patriotic reasons to celebrate the Serbian Revolution taking place southwards in the Ottoman Empire. The church was burned down in 1849 during the upheavals of the Hungarian Revolution and creation of the Serbian Vojvodina, yet it was reconstructed in 1851 when it was consecrated by Serbian Patriarch Josif Rajačić.

During the World War II in Yugoslavia and Hungarian occupation of Yugoslav territories in the region, in April of 1941 the church was bombarded with artillery shells by the Hungarian occupation forces. Both towers and the church roof were significantly damaged while the church was looted and desecrated. Modest reconstruction efforts started after the war and in 1962 the building was listed as a protected monument by the authorities of the Autonomous Province of Vojvodina with major restorations starting in 1985. The building suffered new significant damages in 1987 fire but the iconostasis and other items of greatest value were saved.

== See also ==
- Eparchy of Bačka
