= Crepaja =

Crepaja Црепаја
- Village (Selo)
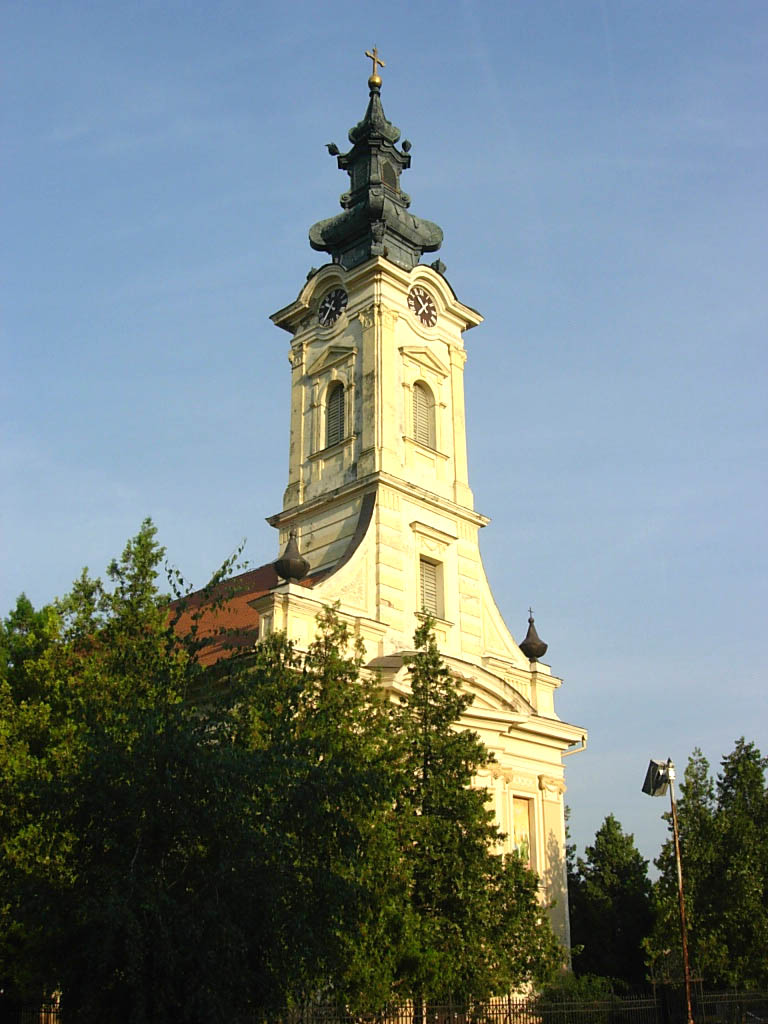
- The Orthodox Church

- Location of Crepaja within Serbia Crepaja (Serbia) Crepaja (Europe)
- Coordinates: 45°00′20″N 20°38′05″E
- Country: Serbia
- Province: Vojvodina
- District: South Banat
- Municipality: Kovačica

Population (2002)
  - Crepaja: 3.866 Serbians - 4.700 Macedonians - 90 Hungarians - 65
- Time zone: UTC+1 (CET)
  - Summer (DST): UTC+2 (CEST)
- Postal code: 26213
- Area code: +381(0)13
- Car plates: PA

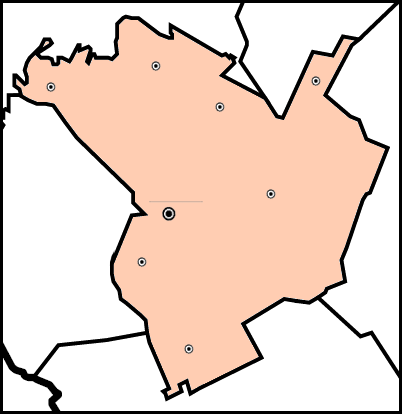

Crepaja (Serbian Cyrillic: Црепаја, pronounced [t͡srɛ̌paja]) is a village in Serbia. It is situated in the Kovačica municipality, in the South Banat District, Vojvodina province, about 18km north from Pančevo. The village has a Serb ethnic majority (88.15%) and its population numbering 3,866 people (2022 census).

The first church in Crepaja was established in 1776, while today's temple was built in 1822. Additions in the later half of the 19th century included three forged metal doors and the iconostasis by Jovan Popović.

== Historical population ==
- 1961: 5,516
- 1971: 5,289
- 1981: 5,369
- 1991: 5,128
- 2002: 4,855
- 2023: 3,786

== See also ==
- List of places in Serbia
- List of cities, towns and villages in Vojvodina
