= Church of St. George, Banoštor =

Church of St. George
- Црква светог Георгија; Crkva svetog Georgija
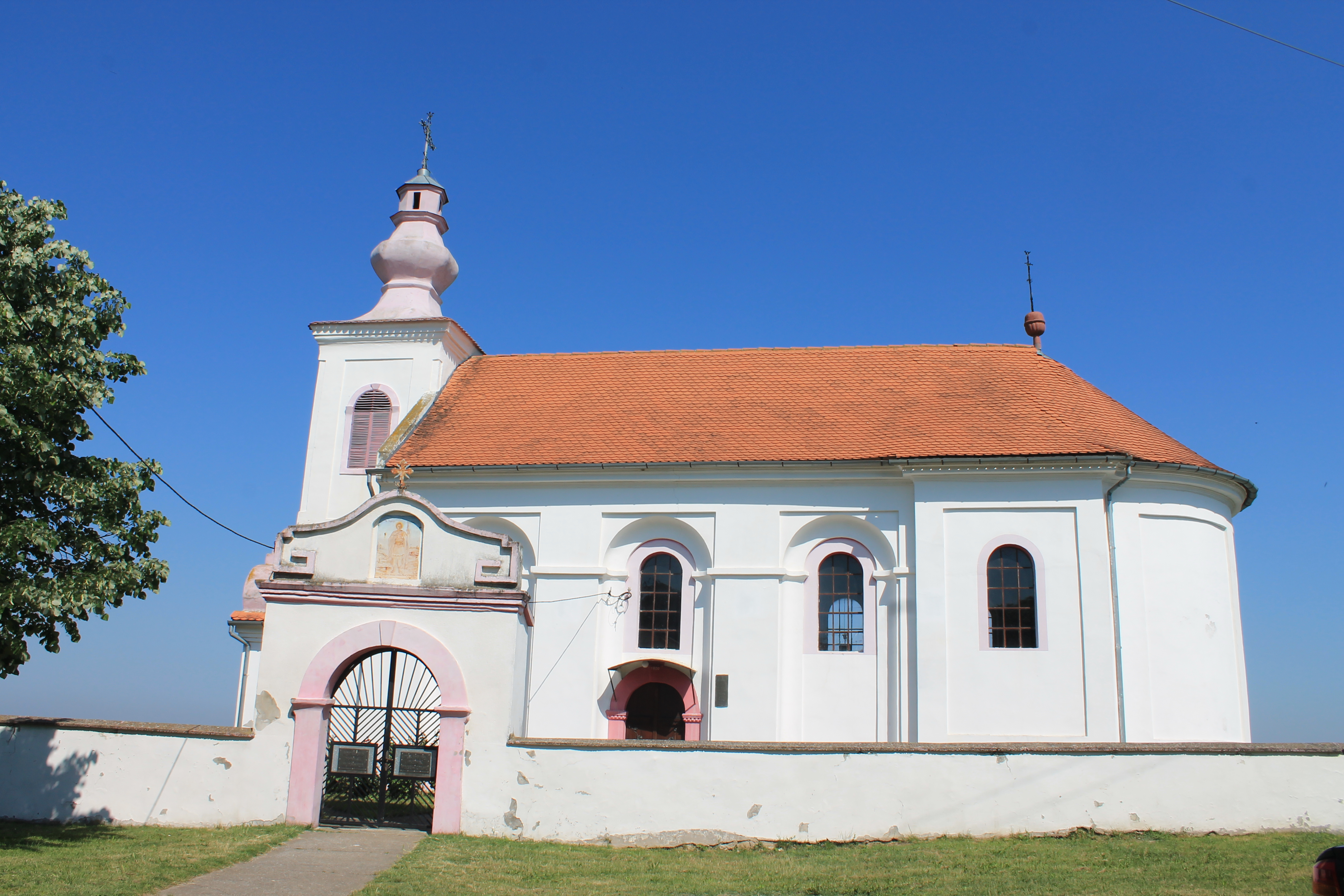
- Church of St George
- Church of St. George
- 45°12′46″N 19°36′50″E
- Location: Banoštor, Vojvodina
- Country: Serbia
- Denomination: Serbian Orthodox

History
- Status: Church
- Dedication: St. George

Architecture
- Functional status: Active
- Style: Neo-classicism
- Years built: XIX century

Administration
- Archdiocese: Eparchy of Srem

The Church of St. George (Serbian: Црква светог Георгија) in Banoštor is Serbian Orthodox church in Vojvodina, Serbia. The building is under the protection of the Republic of Serbia as a part of the Immovable Cultural Heritage of Great Importance. The Orthodox Church in Banoštor, dedicated to Saint Great Martyr George, was erected with an unusually low bell tower compared to other orthodox churches in the region. In the same village there are also ruins of the Roman Catholic church that was built by Danube Swabians community in 1914 in memory of the medieval seat of the Roman Catholic Diocese of Srijem in Banoštor, yet that building was abandoned after the expulsion of Germans from Yugoslavia.

== See also ==
- Eparchy of Srem
