= Konstantin Danil =

Serbian painter (1798–1873)

- Константин Данил
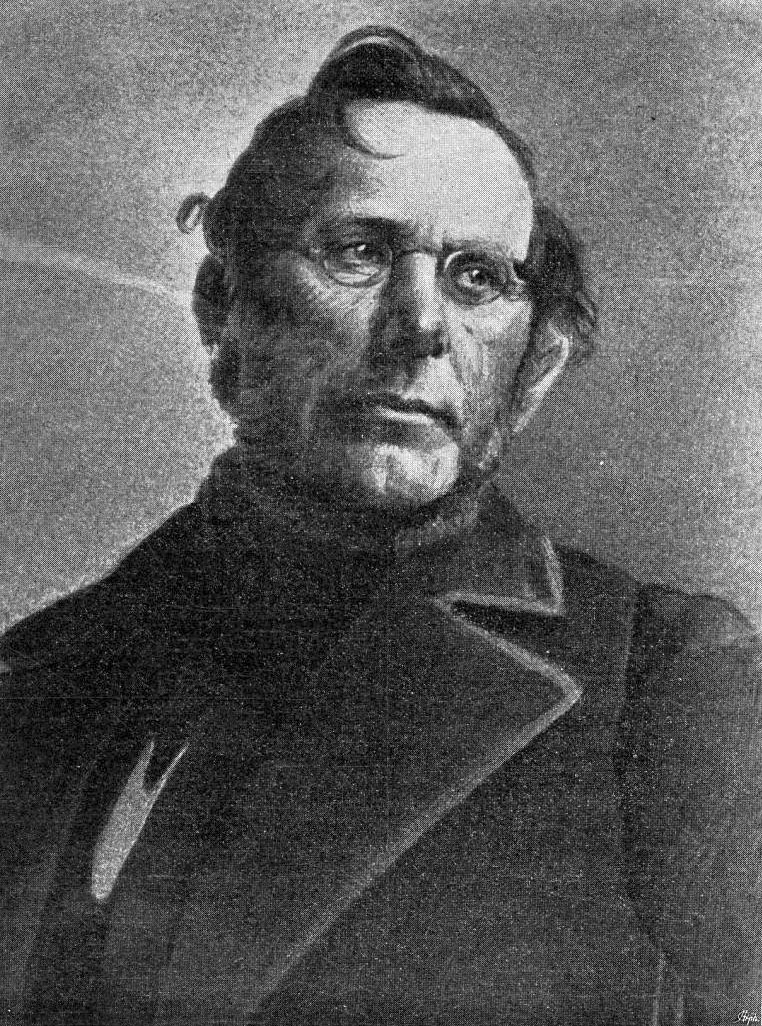
- Born: 1798; Lugoj or Ečka, Hapsburg Empire
- Died: 25 May 1873 (aged 75 or 77); Nagybecskerek, Austria-Hungary (modern-day Zrenjanin, Serbia)
- Known for: Painting
- Notable work: Portrait of the wife Sofia Dely
- Movement: Classicism, Biedermeier

Konstantin Danil (Serbian Cyrillic: Константин Данил, Romanian: Constantin Dănilă; 1798–1873) was a Serbian painter of the 19th century. He is most famous for his portraits and religious painting. Danil is considered to be the most important Serbian painter of Biedermeier.

== Biography ==
According to Felix Kanitz he was born to a Serbian family as Danilo Petrović. Other sources state that his origin and birthplace is unclear. He was born either in Lugoj or Ečka. At the age of thirteen he left Lugoj for Timișoara, where he executed a drawing which procured his admission to the school of Arsenije Teodorović. Teodorović was a principal of a drawing school, and through it he influenced a whole new generation of younger artists, including a few that rivaled him. One of them was Konstantin Danil. Here Konstantin Danil studied for several years, and produced, among other works, a figure of Saint Sava which attracted much attention. The Serbian master gave every encouragement to the young Konstantin Danil for the next four years. Artists had then already started to call Konstantin Danil Grigorović, who was perpetually sketching all sorts of objects in art and in nature, by his father's name Danil.

At the age of seventeen, he left Teodorović and went to the atelier of one of three Viennese academicians, then working in Temișvar. Danil also took lessons from itinerant portrait-painters and afterward entered as a student in the Academy of Arts in Vienna and in Munich. He also took time to travel and paint throughout Banat and Erdelj (Transylvania). Danil had tried his skill in every genre, including portraiture, landscape, flower-painting, scenes of modern life and figure subjects. From Munich, Danil returned to Nagybecskerek (modern-day Zrenjanin), where he resumed the style of Teodorović, and shortly afterward Veliki Bečkerek became his permanent residence.

He married German noblewoman Sofia Dely in 1827. Danil painted local nobleman Karacsony, and when Karacsony became a Viceroy of Banat, Danil's popularity grew.

Having spent much time in the military frontier, and having been with the Austrian troops in actual warfare, he made a specialty of rendering the Military Frontier officers and border men. At the same time, he produced a series of designs illustrative of Old Testament history.

From 1834 to 1873 Danil threw himself into the Biedermeier and the sacral painting based on the school of Vienna Nazarene movement, and became one of its regional leaders. He worked in his own atelier at 37 Tsar Dušan Street in Veliki Bečkerek where numerous Serbian artists were apprenticed, including poet-painter Đura Jakšić and artist Lazar Nikolić, who wrote a biography of his teacher.

Danil was a Serbian Orthodox Christian. In 1872 his wife, Sofia Dely, died, and a year later (1873), Danil died in Nagybecskerek on 13 May.

== Work ==
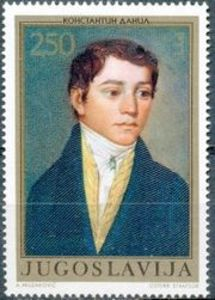
A Yugoslav stamp showing Pavle Jagodić, with inscription "Konstantin Danil" (1802-1873), from the series "Yugoslav Portraits"

His chief pictures are Madonna, Male Portrait, Still Life, Stanci Dely (his father-in-law), Archangel Gabriel, Ms Vaigling, Ms Tetesi, and, best known of all, General Stevan Kničanin and Portrait of Maria (1872). The portraits of his wife Sofia Dely (1840), Petar Jagodić, and A Lady with a Cross are among his best achievements in this class. Danil painted a number of portraits of the wealthe Jagodić family.

Portrait of Captain Kljunović and his wife impressed a Serbian Orthodox priest by the name of Arsenović, who selected Danil to decorate the walls, dome and iconostasis of a new Serbian Orthodox church in Pančevo with figures of saints. Upon completion of his commission (iconostasis) in 1833 Danil received an honorarium of 4,000 silver florins. Iconostases painted by Danil can also be found in Timișoara, Uzdin, Dobrica and Jarkovac.

=== Public collections ===
His work can be found in the following public collections:

- National Museum of Serbia
- Gallery of Matica Srpska
- Timișoara Art Museum
- National Museum of Pančevo
- National Museum of Zrenjanin
- A lot of his work used to be found in private collections.

== Legacy ==
Danil is remembered as a master of technique, and his portraits reveal an extraordinary study into the characters of his subjects. Nevertheless, for some time after his death his name was almost forgotten by the public, and it is only in the twentieth century that he has been conceded the position among the masters of the modern Serbian school which is his due.

On the basis of his early art work in Temișvar, Konstantin Danil is also claimed by three other nations, Romania, Austria and Hungary.

He is included in The 100 most prominent Serbs.

== Gallery ==
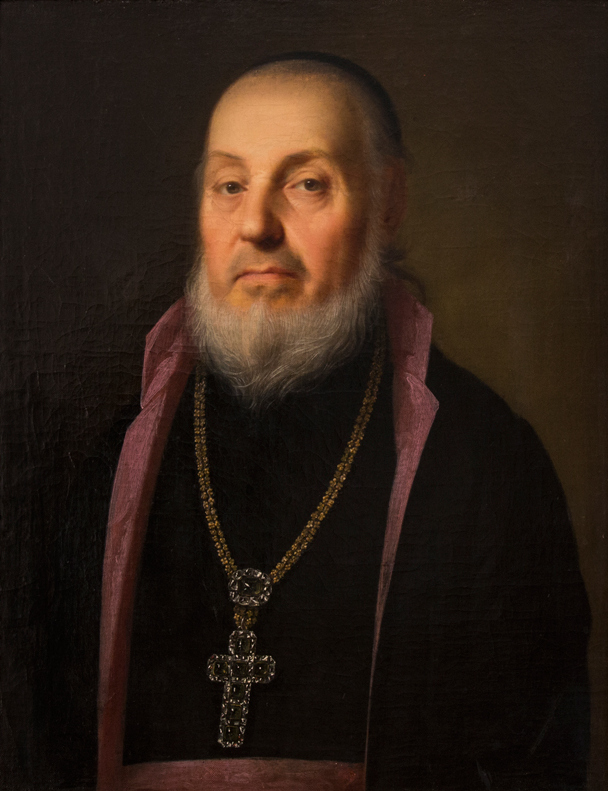
Portrait of Pavle Kenđelac, 1832-1834

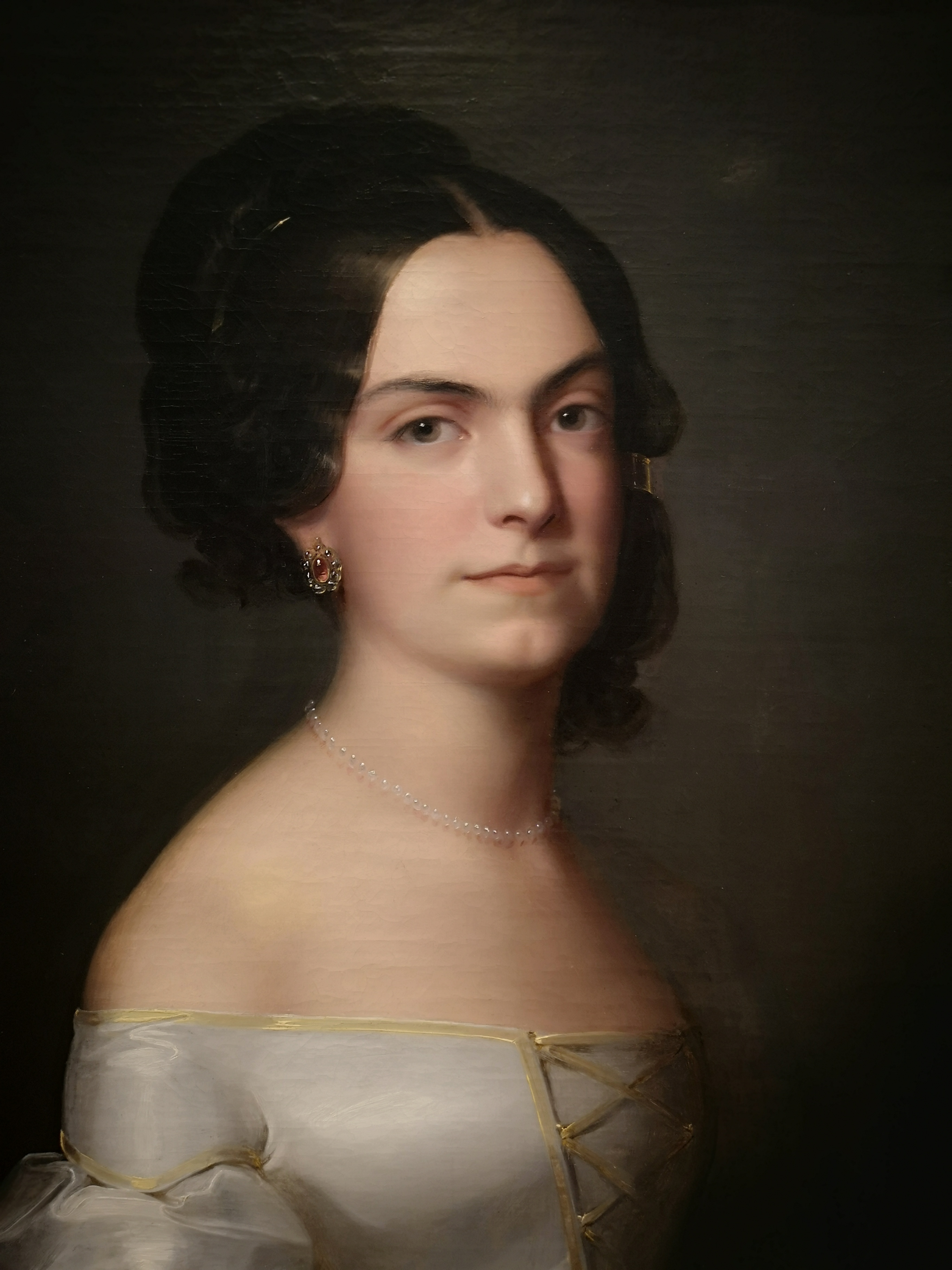
Portrait of Madame Tőtössy,1835-1840

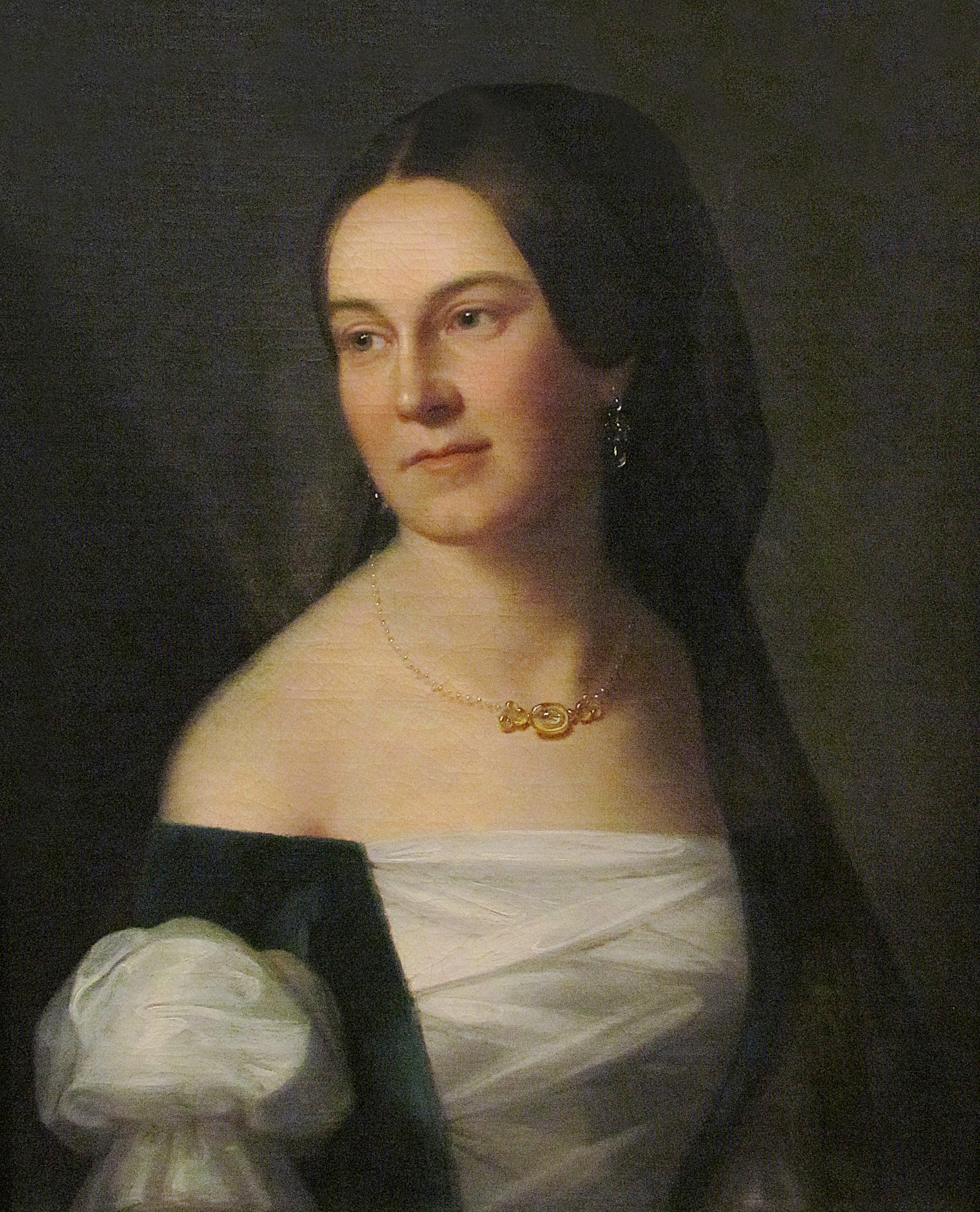
Portrait of mrs. Vailgling, after 1840

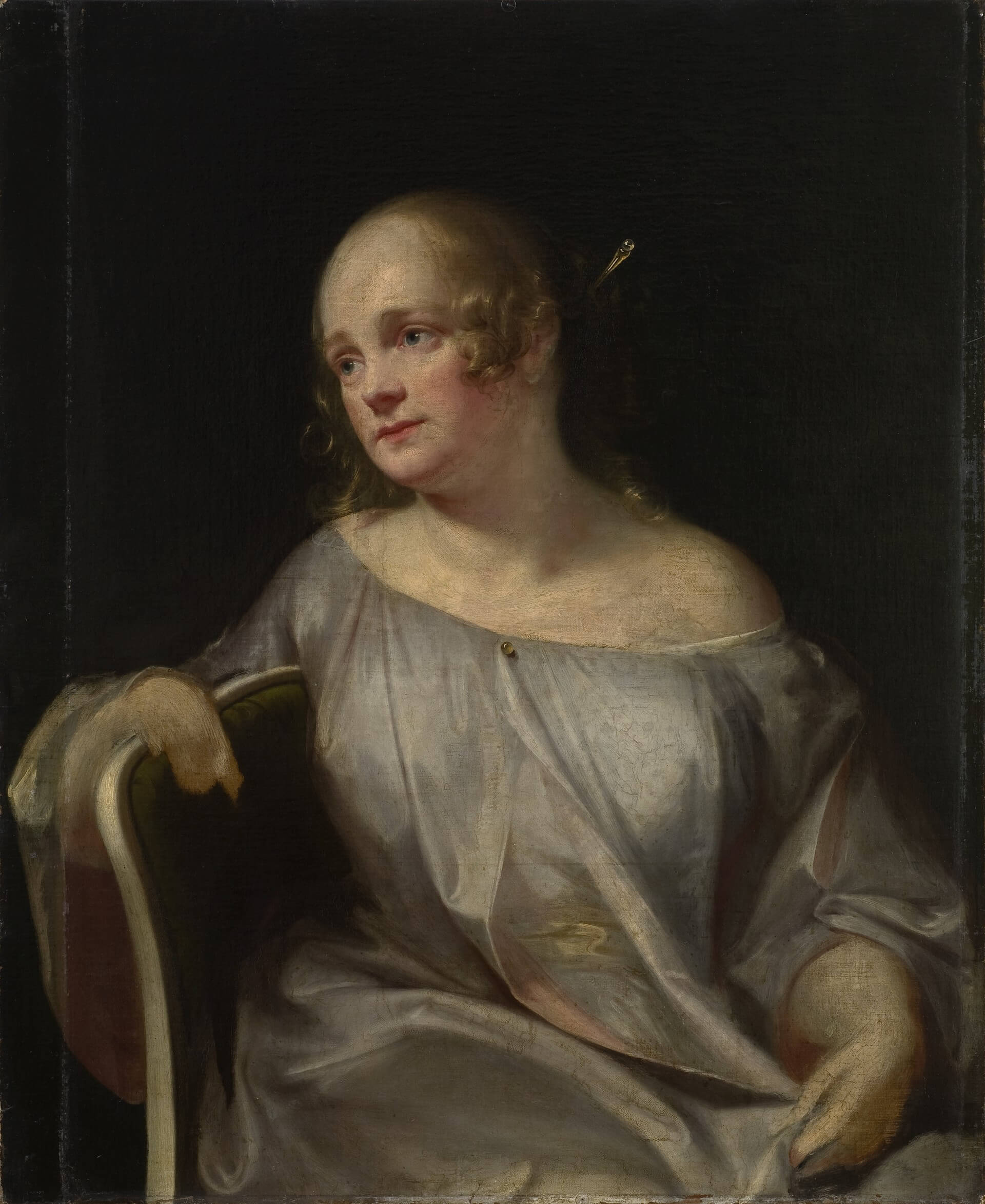
Portrait of the wife Sofia Dely, c. 1850

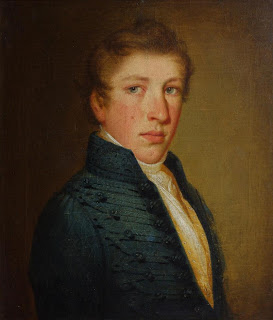
Danil Jagodić, 1873

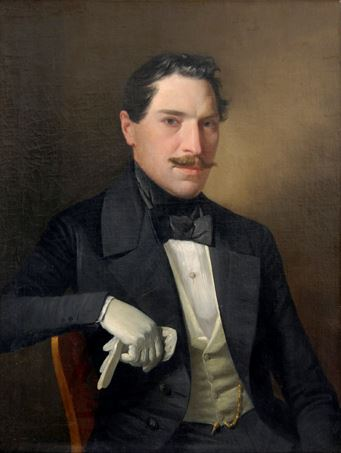
Man in White Gloves, 1873

== See also ==
- List of Serbian painters
