= Memorial Complex in Idvor (Mihajlo Pupin) =

Serbian shrine to Mihajlo Pupin

- Меморијални комплекс у Идвору; Memorijalni kompleks u Idvoru
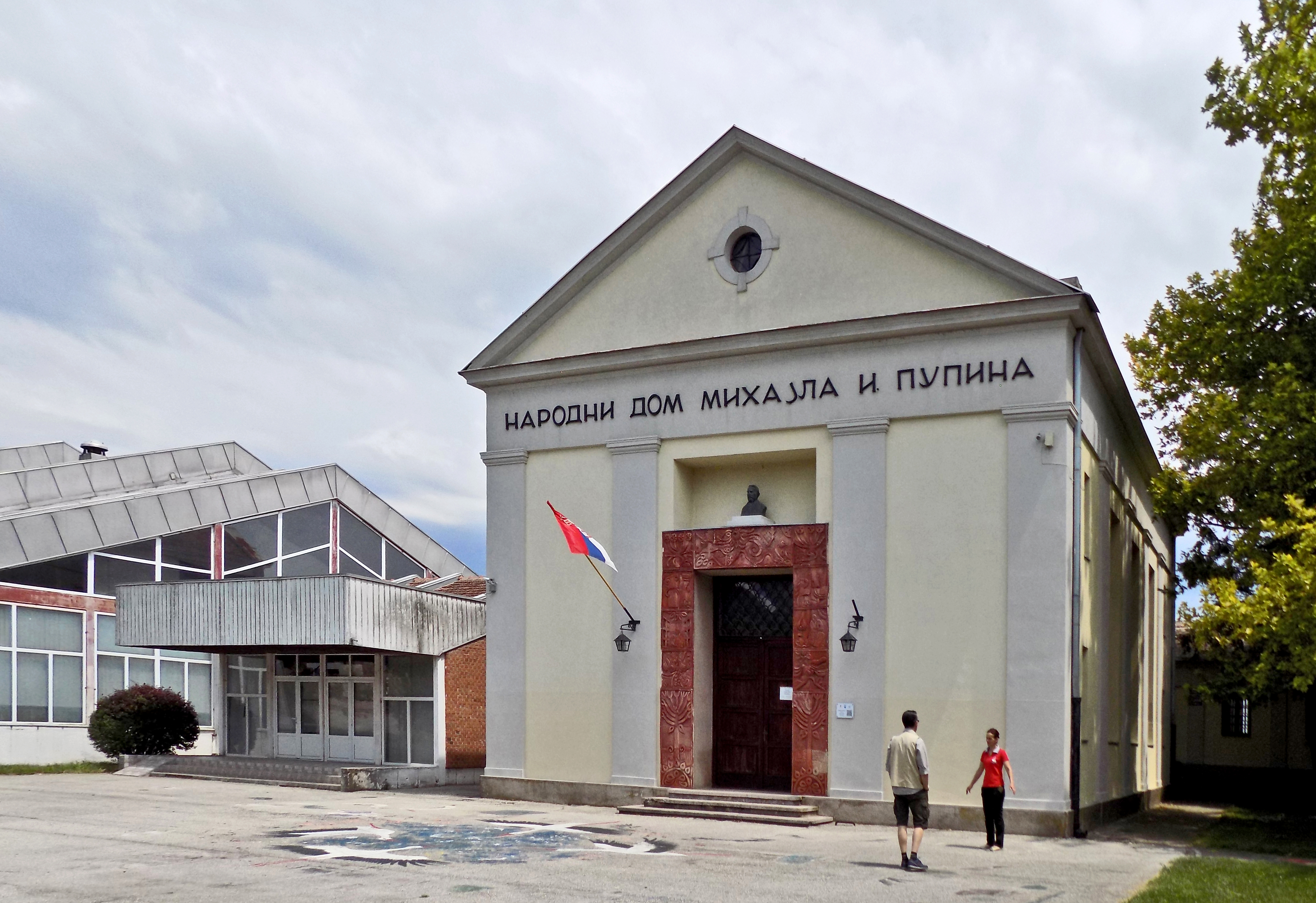
- The National House of Mihajlo Pupin
- Established: 1979; 47 years ago
- Location: Idvor, Vojvodina, Serbia
- Coordinates: 45.19°N 20.51247°E
- Type: Memorial
- Visitors: 10.000
- Website: www.muzejpupina.rs

Memorial Complex in Idvor is dedicated to the life and work of Mihajlo Pupin. It is located in Pupin's native village Idvor in Vojvodina (Serbia). The Memorial Complex in Idvor consists of Mihajlo Pupin's home, the Old School, the elementary school which he attended and the National Home which is Pupin's foundation. Memorial Complex in Idvor is protected as a monument of culture of exceptional Importance.

== About Mihajlo Pupin ==
Mihajlo Idvorski Pupin, also known as Michael I. Pupin, was a Serbian-American physicist, physical chemist, and philanthropist. He is best known for his numerous patents, including a means of greatly extending the range of long-distance telephone communication by placing loading coils (of wire) at predetermined intervals along the transmitting wire (known as "pupinization"). Pupin was a founding member of National Advisory Committee for Aeronautics (NACA) on 3 March 1915, which later became NASA, and he participated in the founding of the American Mathematical Society and the American Physical Society.

In 1924, he won a Pulitzer Prize for his autobiography From Immigrant to Inventor. Pupin was elected president or vice-president of the highest scientific and technical institutions, such as the American Institute of Electrical Engineers, the New York Academy of Sciences, the Radio Institute of America, and the American Association for the Advancement of Science. He was also an honorary consul of Serbia in the United States from 1912 to 1920 and played a role in determining the borders of newly formed Kingdom of Yugoslavia.

== About the Memorial complex ==
Native complex dedicated to Mihajlo Pupin was established in 1979. In the complex, there is a native house where he lived with his family: father Constantine, mother Olimpijada, four brothers and five sisters. In addition, the complex encompasses National House, which Pupin built with his funds for Idvor, and a museum, in the old elementary school building that he once attended.

=== The birth house of Mihajlo Pupin ===
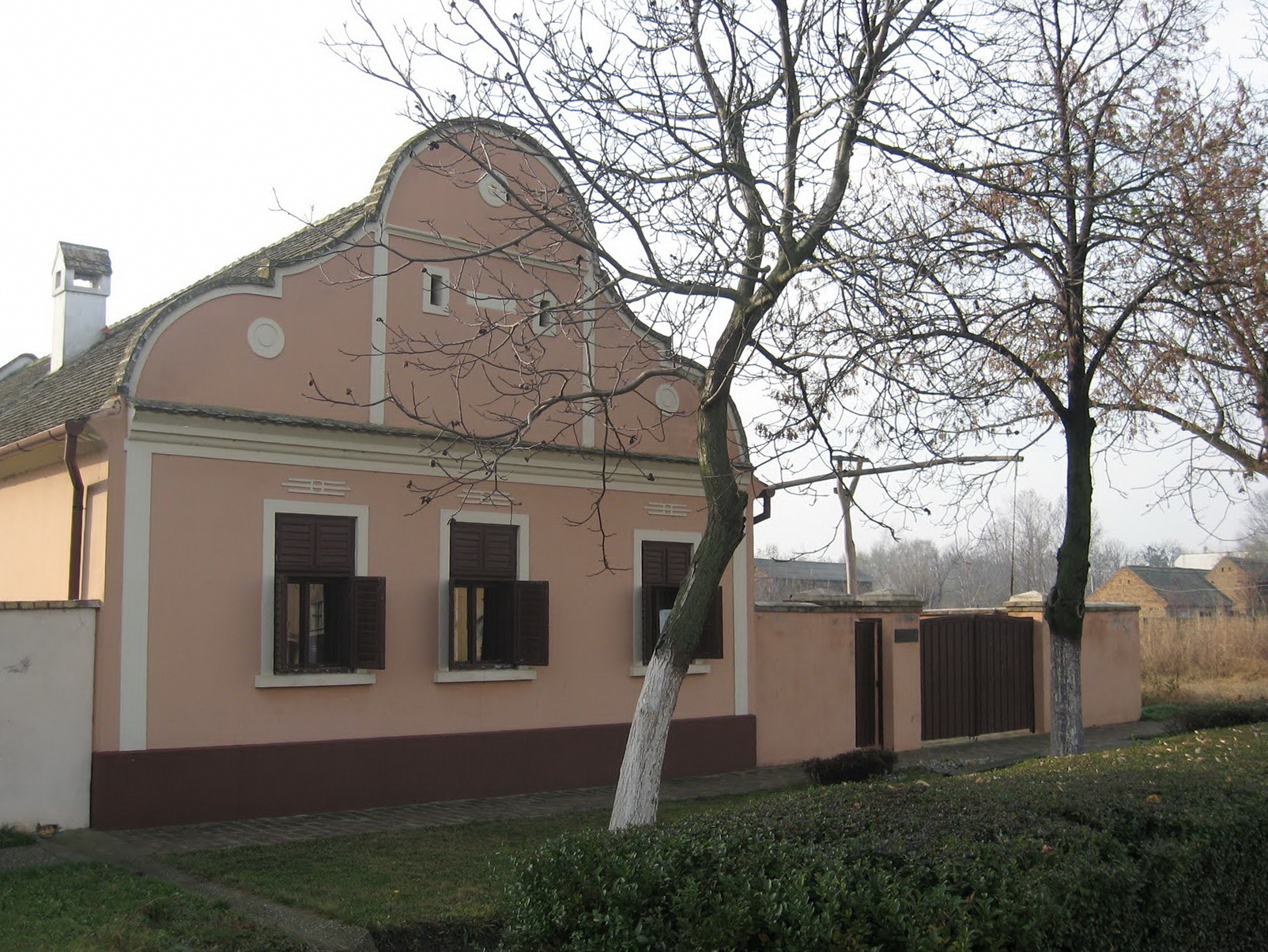
The birth house of Mihajlo Pupin in Idvor

The birth house of Mihajlo Pupin is a target of a sort of a pilgrimage. It was built as a larger type of the Pannonian house otherwise known as "the clod house". Its basis is rectangular, in the street line and its narrow side is facing the street. The street side of the house has one larger room with two windows and a smaller one with one window. The larger room leads to the kitchen which is the center of the house leading into another room which faces the yard. In each of the two larger rooms there is one walled furnace which were fueled from the kitchen and the kitchen was the room with the open chimney. The small room which faces the street leads into the entrance porch with brick pillars. The entire house was made of bricks, plastered and painted. The house is covered with gable roof with simple roof tiles. It has the fronton facing the street typical to the houses in Vojvodina.

The house was first restored in 1979, however the reconstruction performed in 2004 gave the house the appearance it has today. Today the house is an ethno-museum. The furniture in it did not precisely belong to Pupin's parents, but it is authentic for the period of Pupin's life in the house. The small room facing the street has been adapted to look as a studio, with several photographs of Mihajlo Pupin, his letters and personal things.

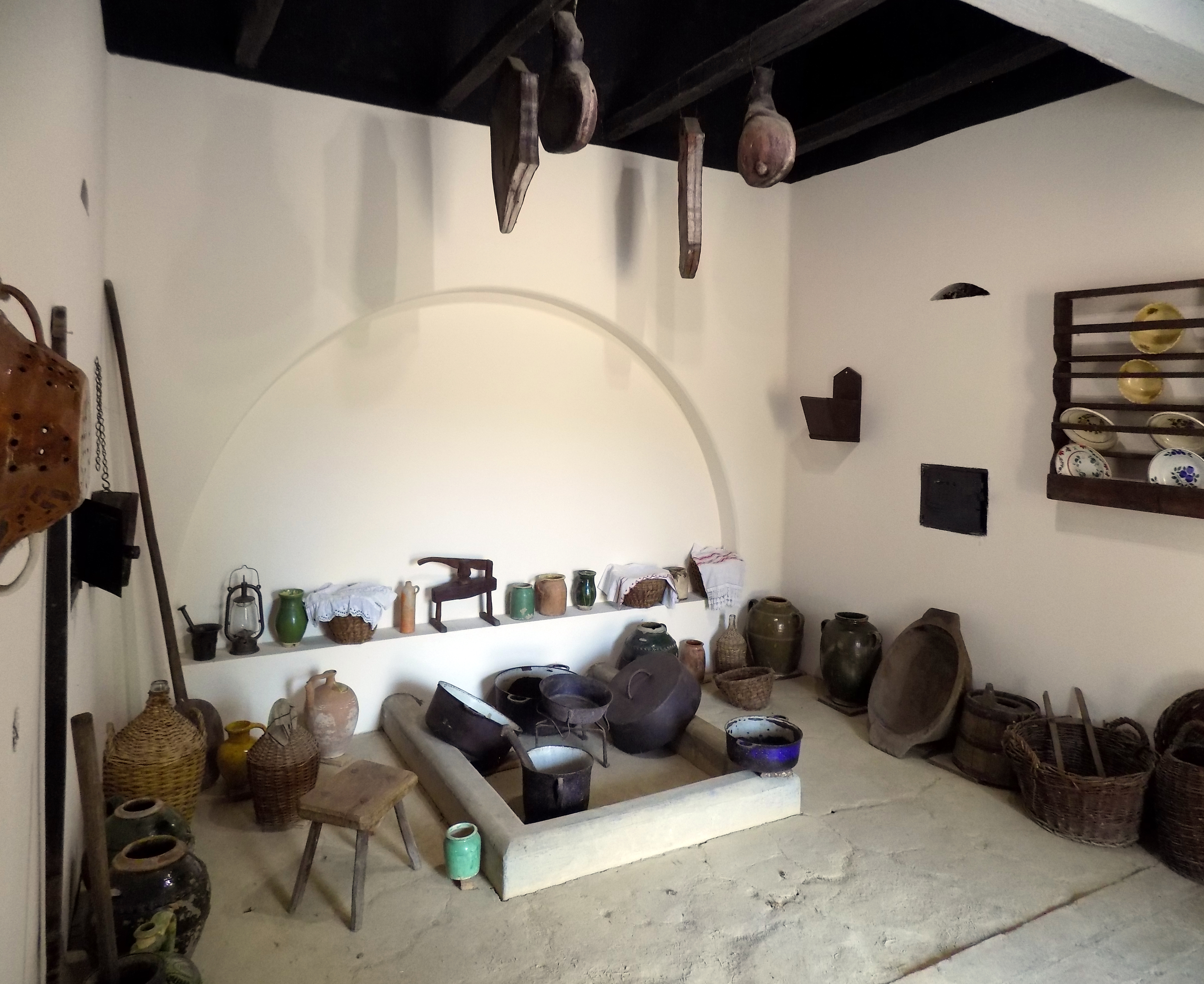
Central room of the house with fireplace

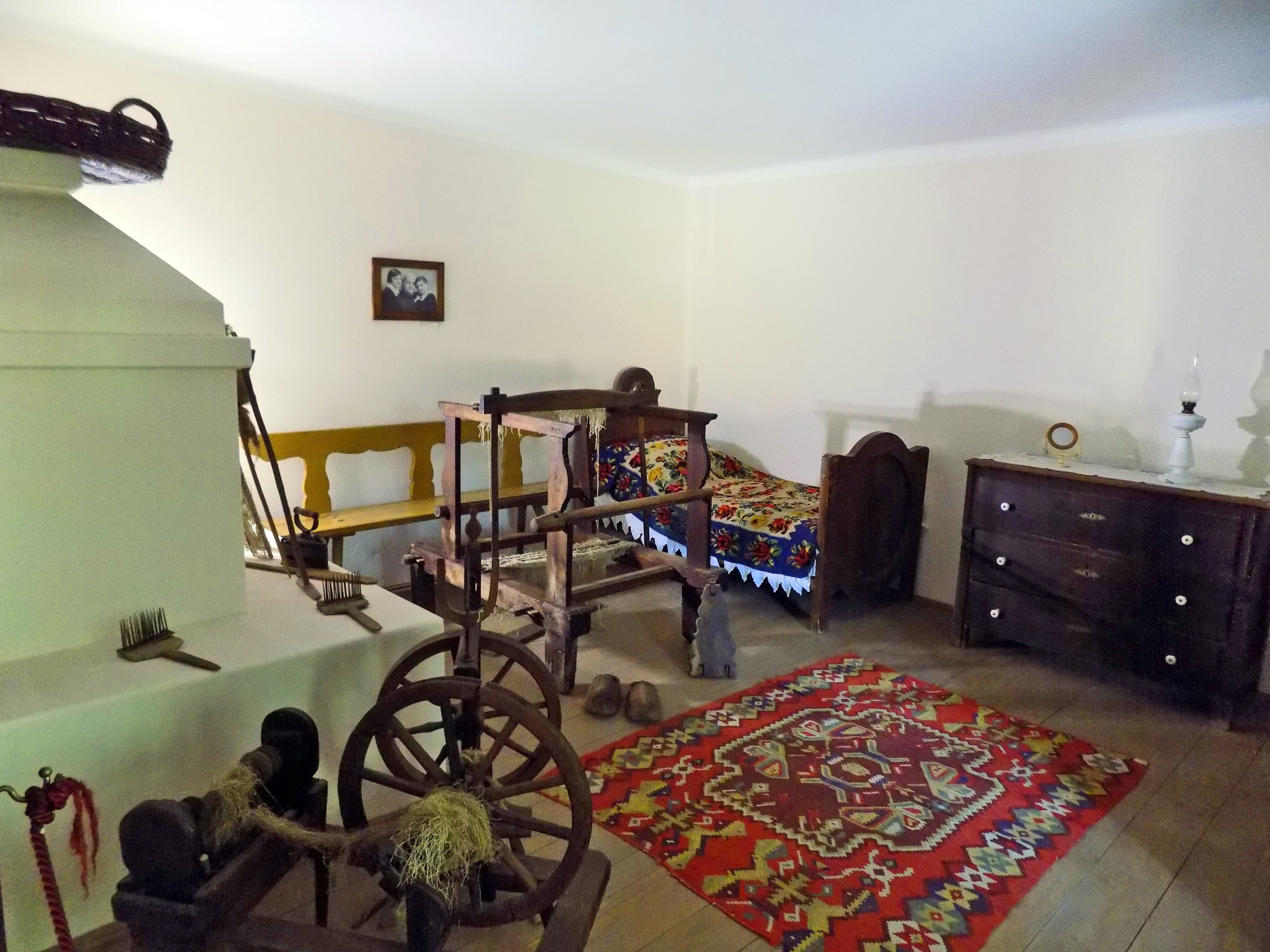
"Female" room with a brick stove

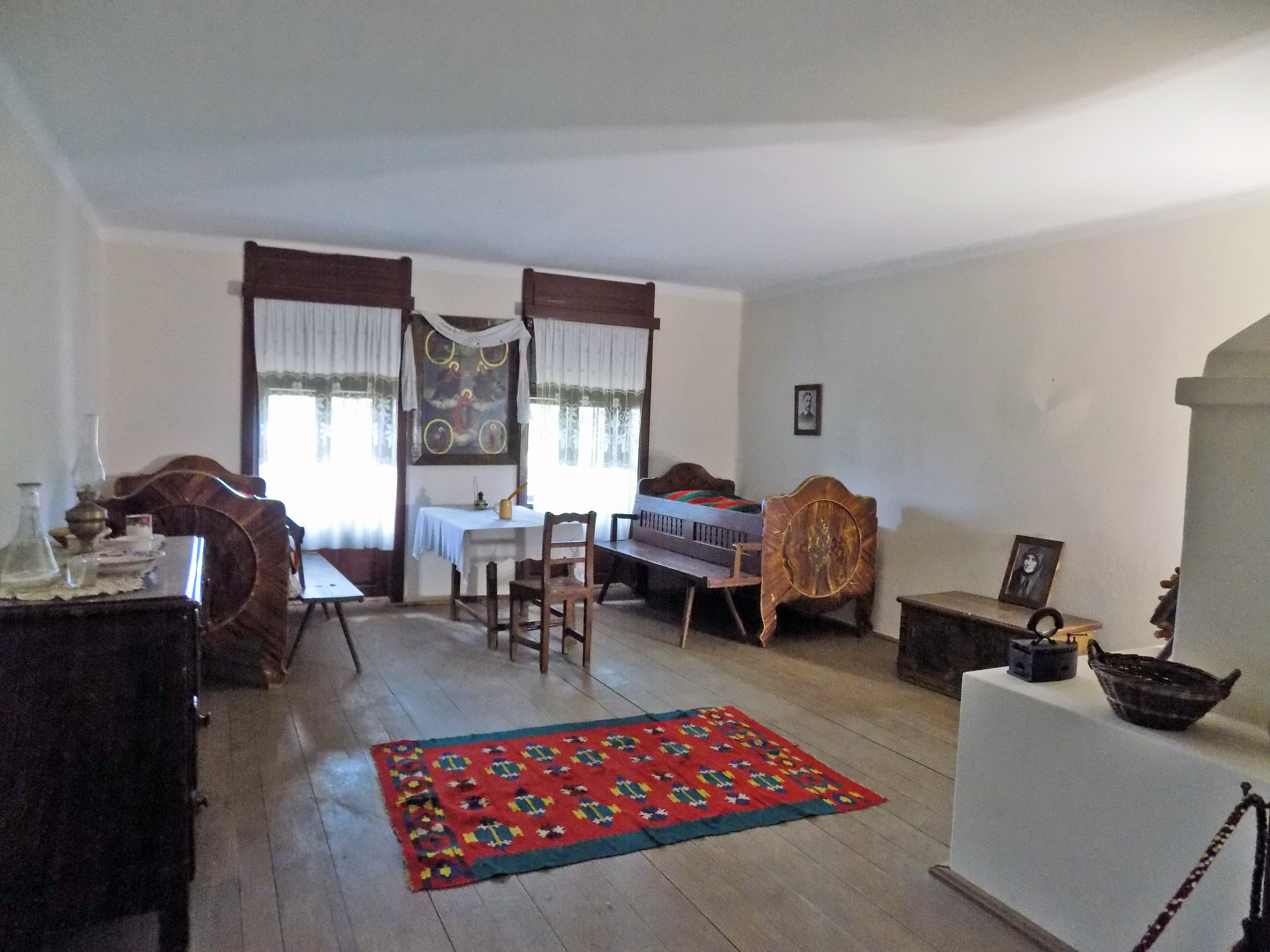
"Male" room with a brick stove

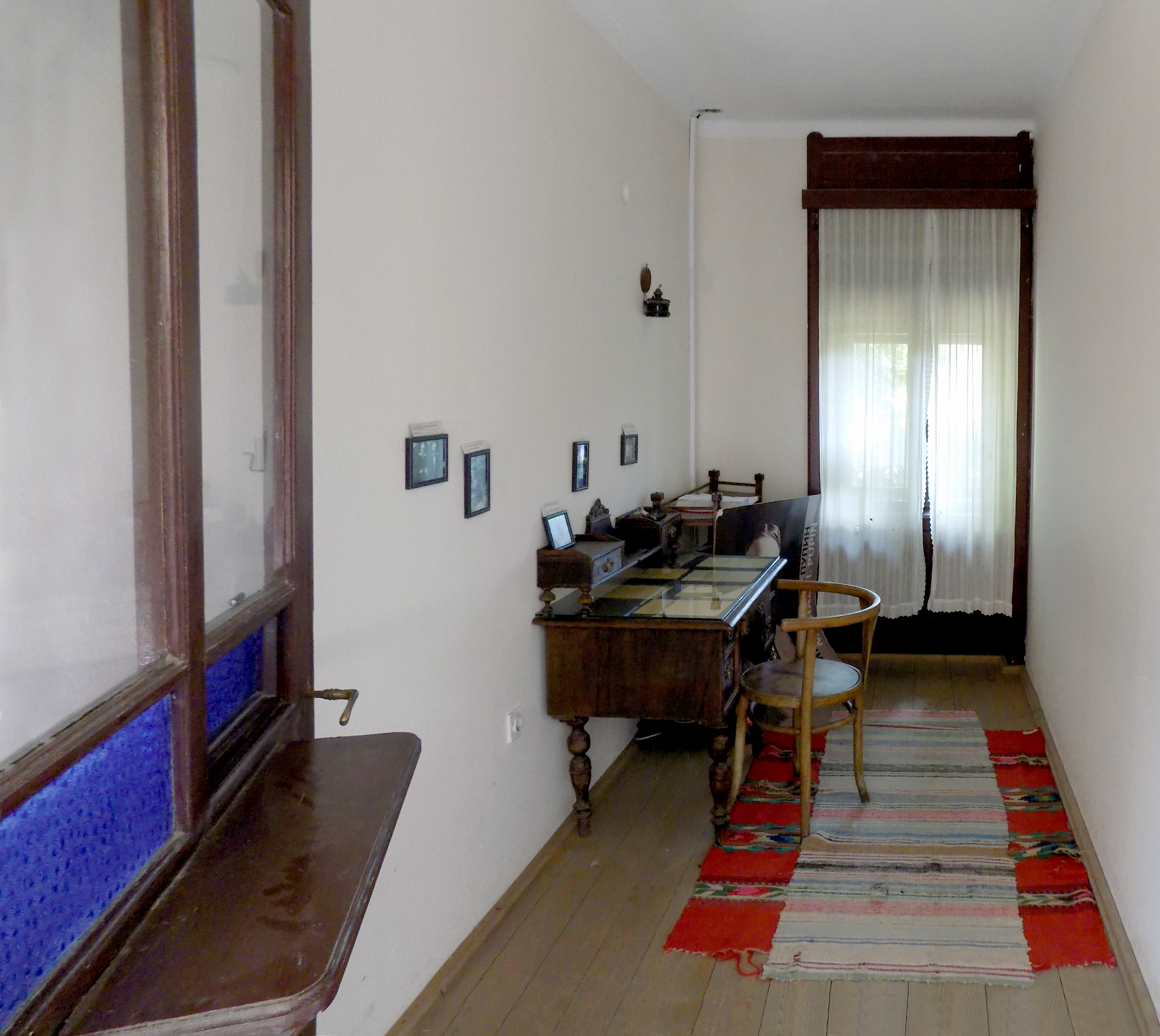
Memorial room

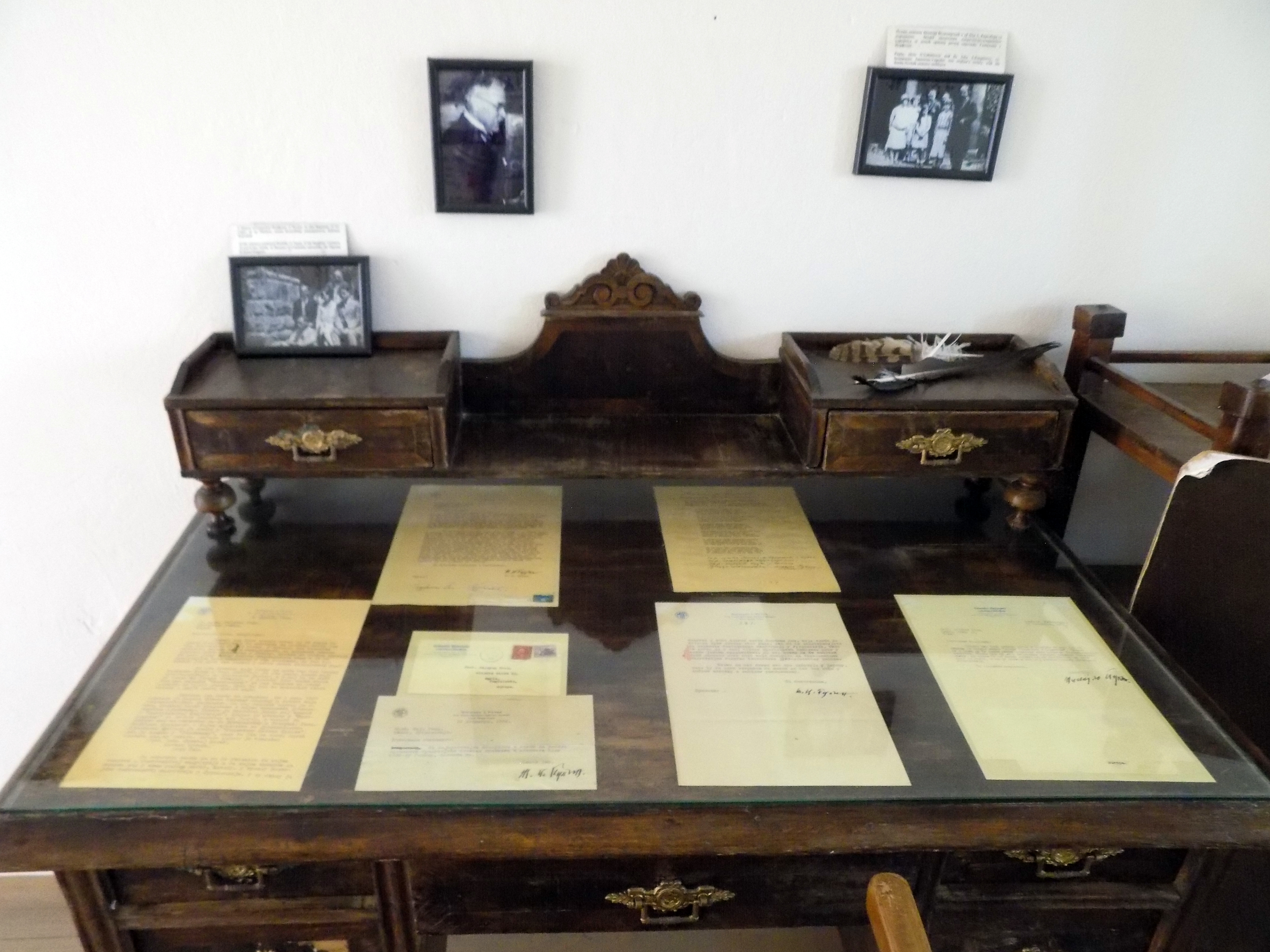
Pupin's letters and photographs in the memorial room

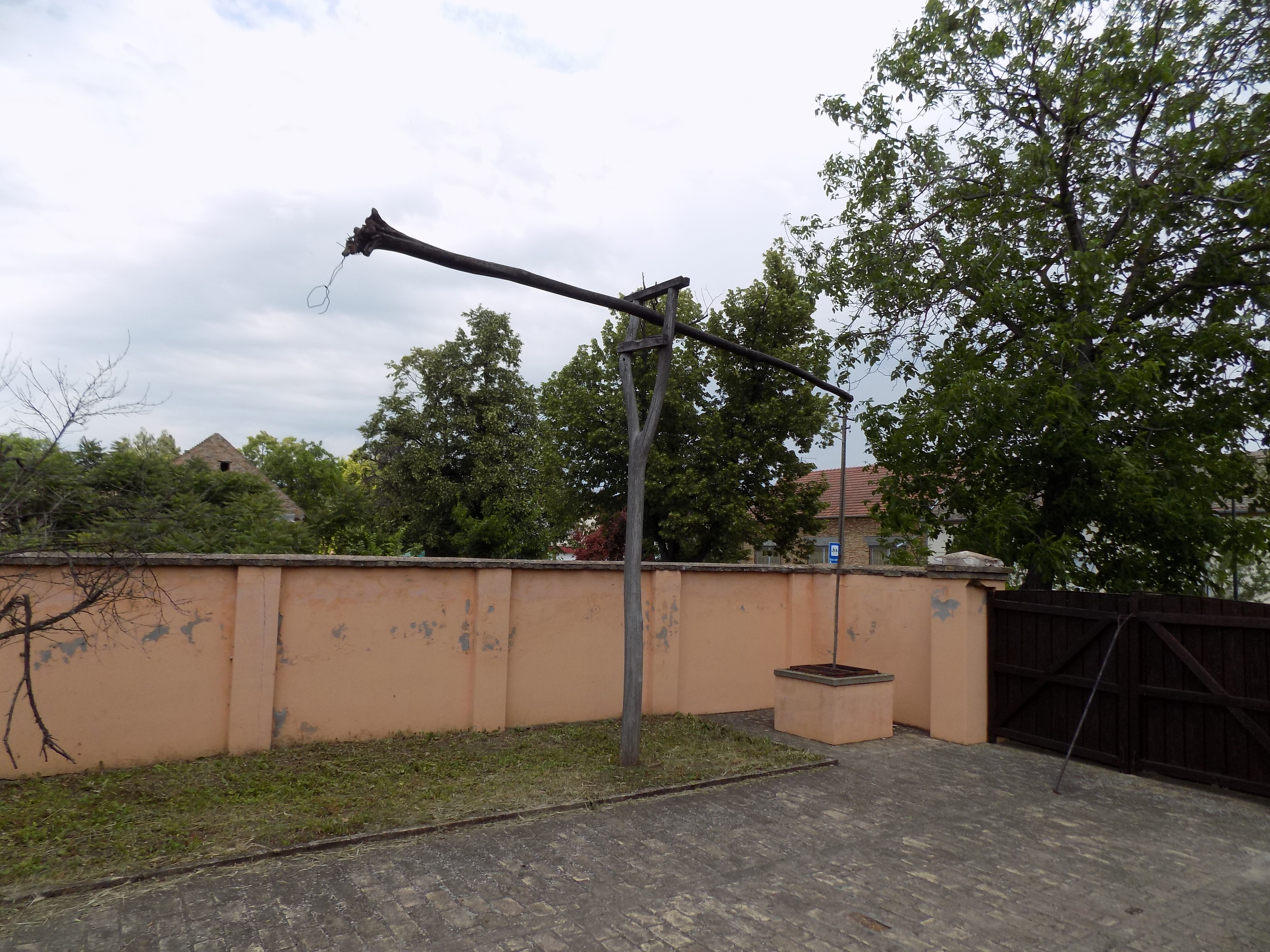
An old well next to the gate, in front of the entrance to the house

=== The old school ===
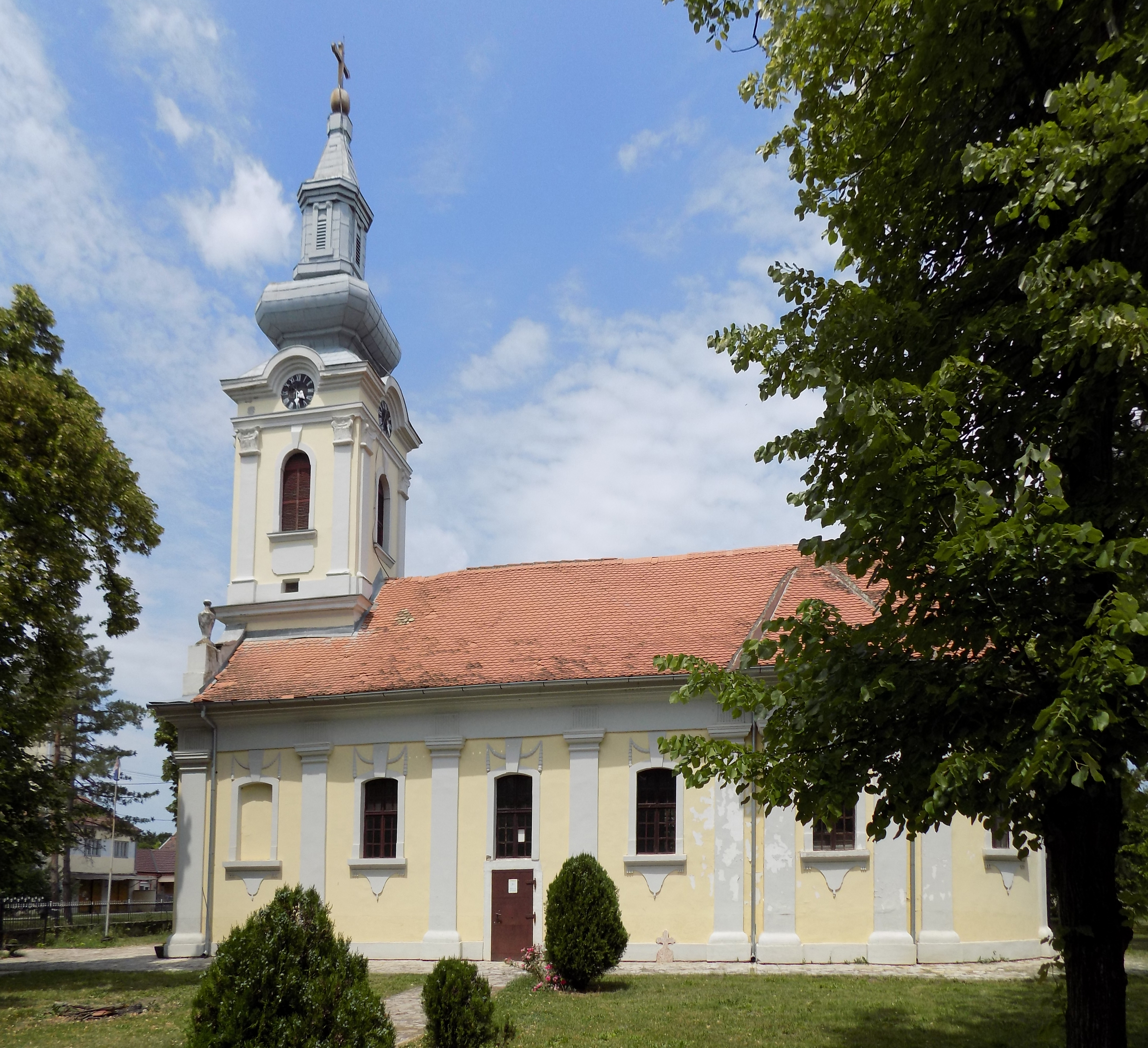
Church of the Annunciation of the Holy Mother, the church in which Pupin was baptized and in whose yard he built the National House

The Old School building was constructed in 1843. Mihajlo Pupin was educated in that school. It was the school until 1979, when Idvor got a new, modern school building. It is in immediate vicinity of the National Home. The building has rectangular basis and its longer side with the entrance is facing the park while the shorter side is facing the street. It is the building made of bricks, it has only a ground floor and its roof is made of wood and covered with simple roof tiles. Its basis is symmetrical and there are central hall, two classrooms, annex rooms and two porches on the side of the school leading to the yard. The classroom turned into a museum has a walled furnace. All the rooms have wooden floors, but the entry hall floor is covered with the six-angled bricks. The façade is simple which is common for the architectural style of the age in the Austrian provinces. It exhibits the characteristics of simplified neo-classicist style flat lintels with the imitation of the arches, simple cornice and parapet plates. The front façade has two sections, the central one slightly projecting before the two lateral ones. The façade is divided by pillars between the windows and the pillars in the middle were additionally decorated with shallow rustic plates. The double doors on the main entrance have geometrical ornaments. The rear façade is simple, unornamented with the entrance at its center and two porches with three arches above them.

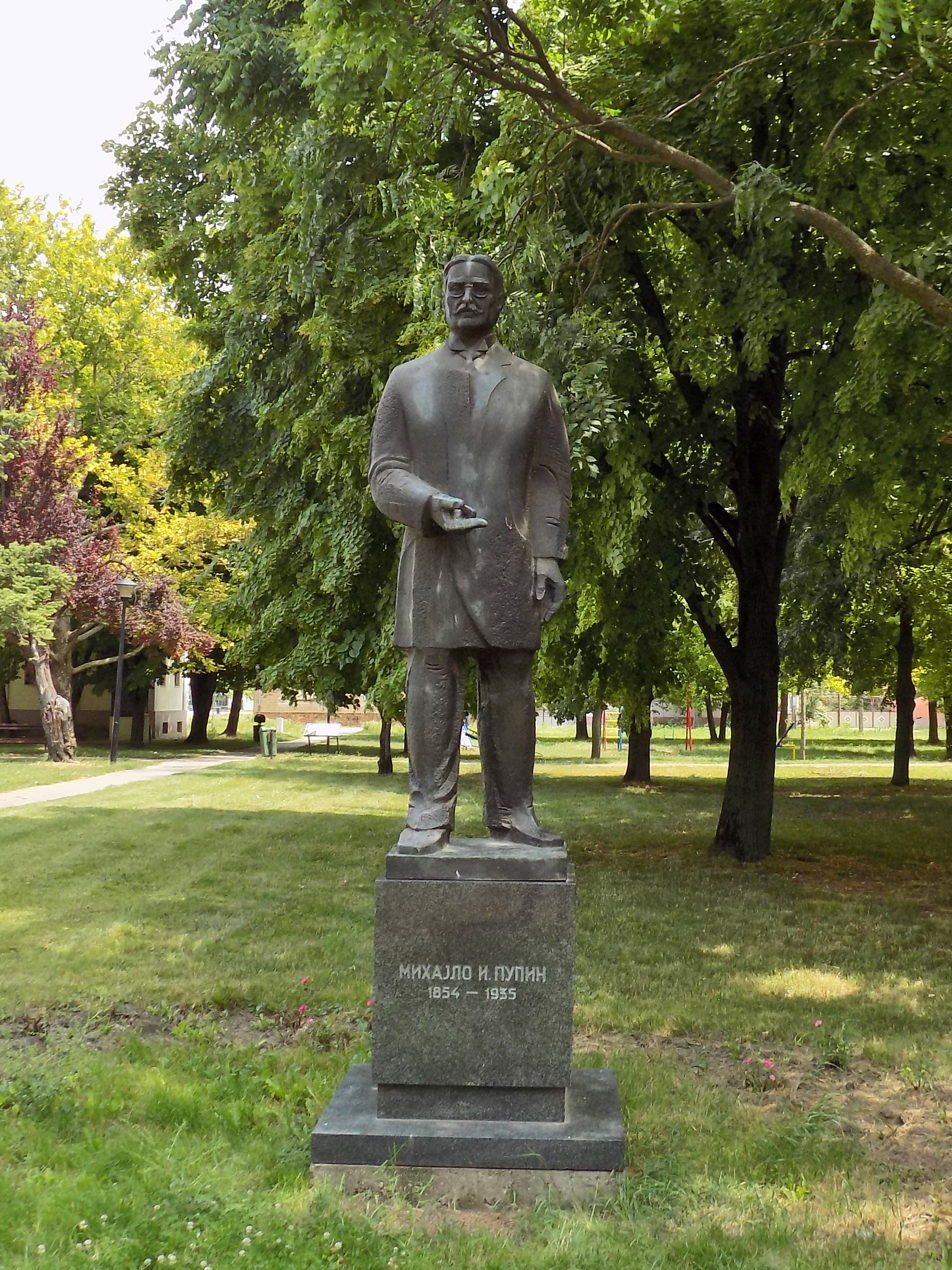
A monument to Mihajlo Pupin in the park in front of the endowment. The monument is the work of sculptor Aleksandar Zarin

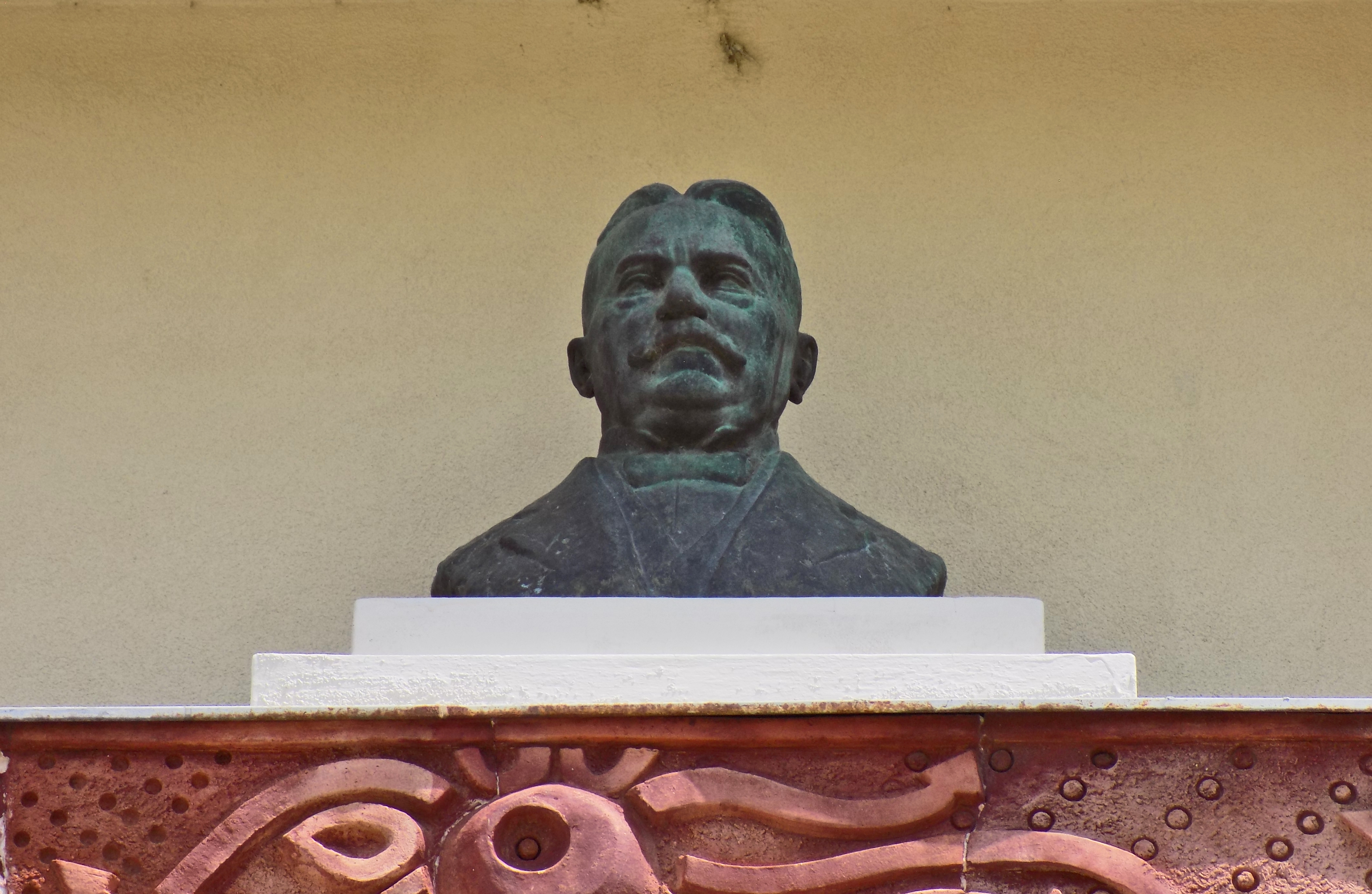
Pupin's bust above the entrance, the work of sculptor Ivan Meštrović

In 1979, in the classroom at the right side of the entrance, the Museum of Vojvodina in Novi Sad has set an exhibition dedicated to life and work of Mihajlo Pupin, which stands to the present day. It unravels the life story of the great scientist, starting with the first steps he had taken in his parents' home to the immense success he achieved in the US and in his homeland. In 2012, in the other classroom, the village school teacher cooperated with the local Culture Center to arrange the ethno-exhibition of old items once used in the country. Other parts of the building are not used.

=== The National House Mihajlo Pupin ===
The National House Mihajlo Pupin is the foundation that the reputed scientist endowed to ldvor and its people, which was supposed to become a National University. It was opened in 1936, nearly a year after Mihajlo Pupin passed away (Pupin died in New York on 12 March 1935). Pupin wanted the National House to become a center of knowledge in which young people would be able to be educated in the field of agriculture. The Home would be, according to Pupin ″not simply a lecture hall, but also school for the Idvor’s youth and other inhabitants to learn about growing fruit and vegetables″.

Mihajlo Pupin spoke for the first time about his intentions to finance the construction of the National Home in Idvor in the article called ″The Gardening Production″ published in the magazine the ″Privrednik″ (Businessman) in its November–December issue in 1933. For the location of the National House, Pupin chose the land in the immediate vicinity of the village church, so he made an agreement with the church administration to take over a part of the church yard for the new building. Sponsored by the Belgrade association ″Businessman″, he established the ″Mihajlo Pupin″ Fund for the development of agricultural sciences which had at its disposal the funds deposited in the Serbian-American Bank intended for the construction and maintenance of the National Home. When the construction started, Pupin was supervising all the construction works, technical and financial details, but he died before it was completed. The National Home was opened to the public in 1936, less than a year after Pupin's death, and it was the fairest and the most modern building in the area at the time, but it never became a university that Pupin intended it to be. The National House was used as a Cultural Center, a place where were organized various events, film screenings and local political gatherings until 1979. For some time after the Second World War, it was used as a warehouse for storing wheat.

The architectural style exhibits neo-classicism characteristics. The front is divided by pilasters, entrance portal and a fronton in the upper section of the building. The portal is flanked by door frames and a lintel which were added in the 70s made of burnt clay by ceramist Delija Prvački. There is Pupin's bust, a work of the sculptor Ivan Meštrović in the niche, above the entrance doors. Aside from the 150-seat hall with a gallery, a stage and offices, there are also a library, electric power generator and a radio system that could reach the entire Idvor. The Home has a sewage system which is functional at present day. In 1979, on the occasion of the celebration of the 120th anniversary of Pupin's birth, a new building of the Cultural Center was built next to the National House, according to the project of the architect Bogdan Bogdanović. It is a reinforced concrete construction with a hall of 300 seats and annex premises.

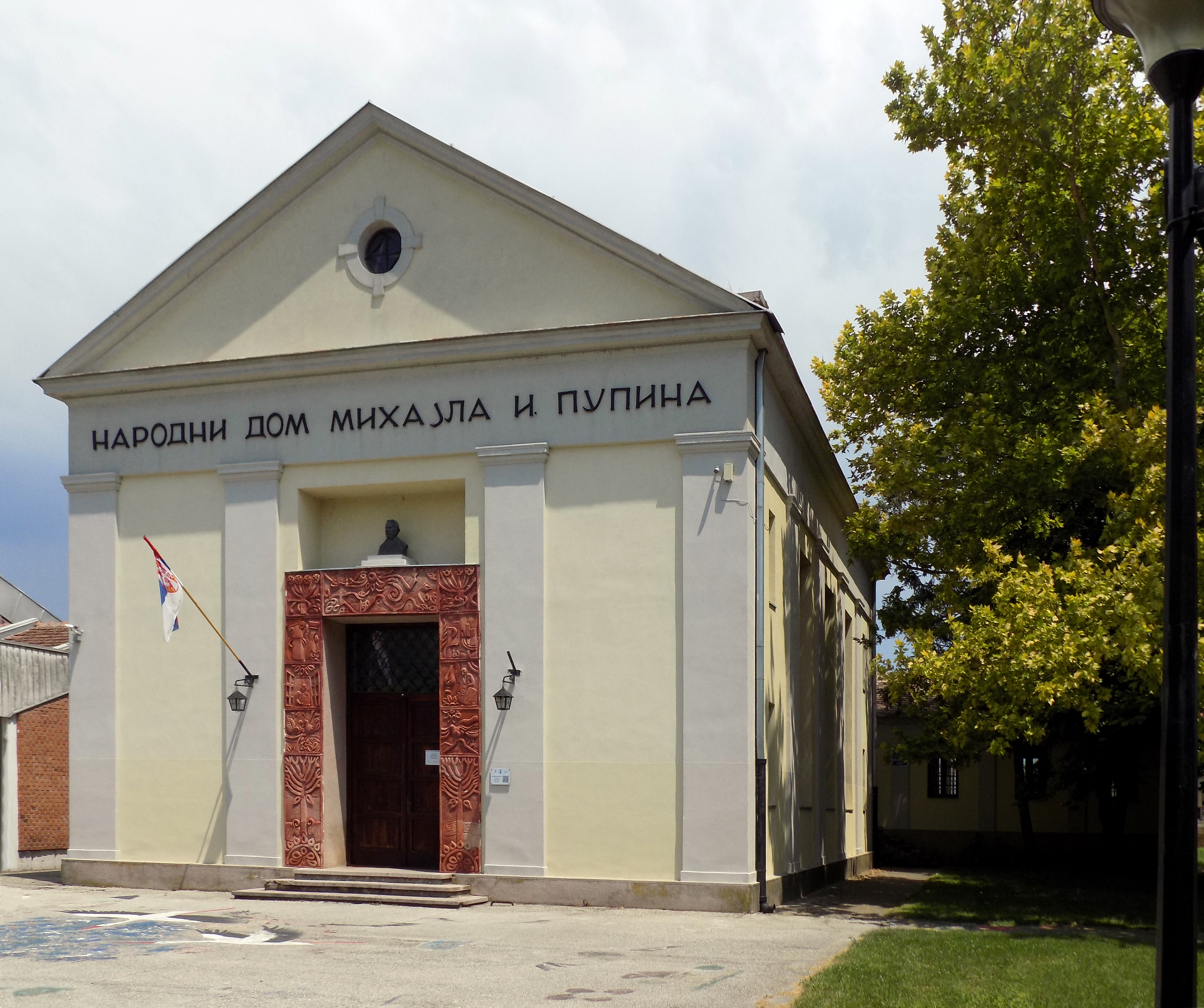
National House building

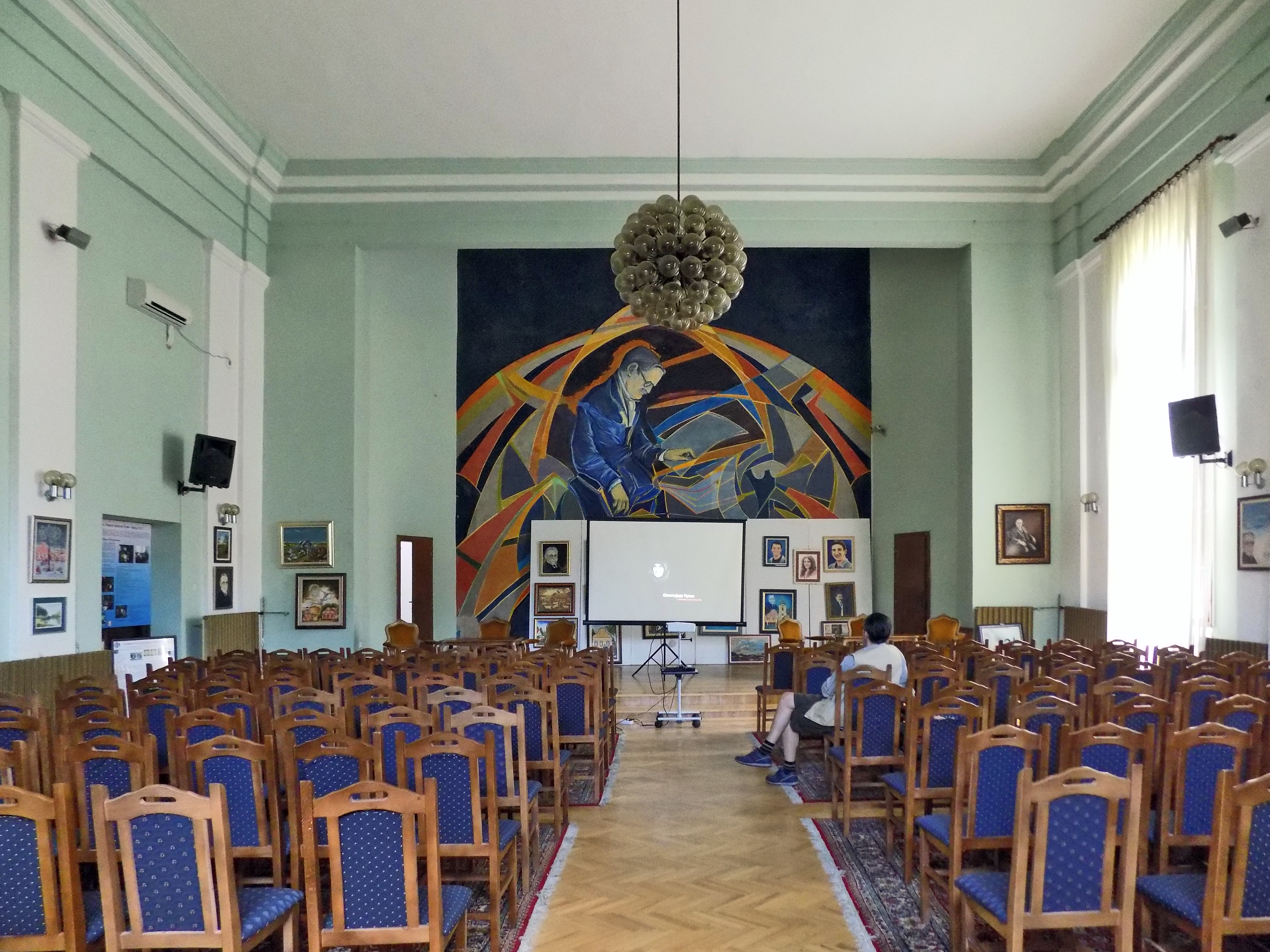
Main hall

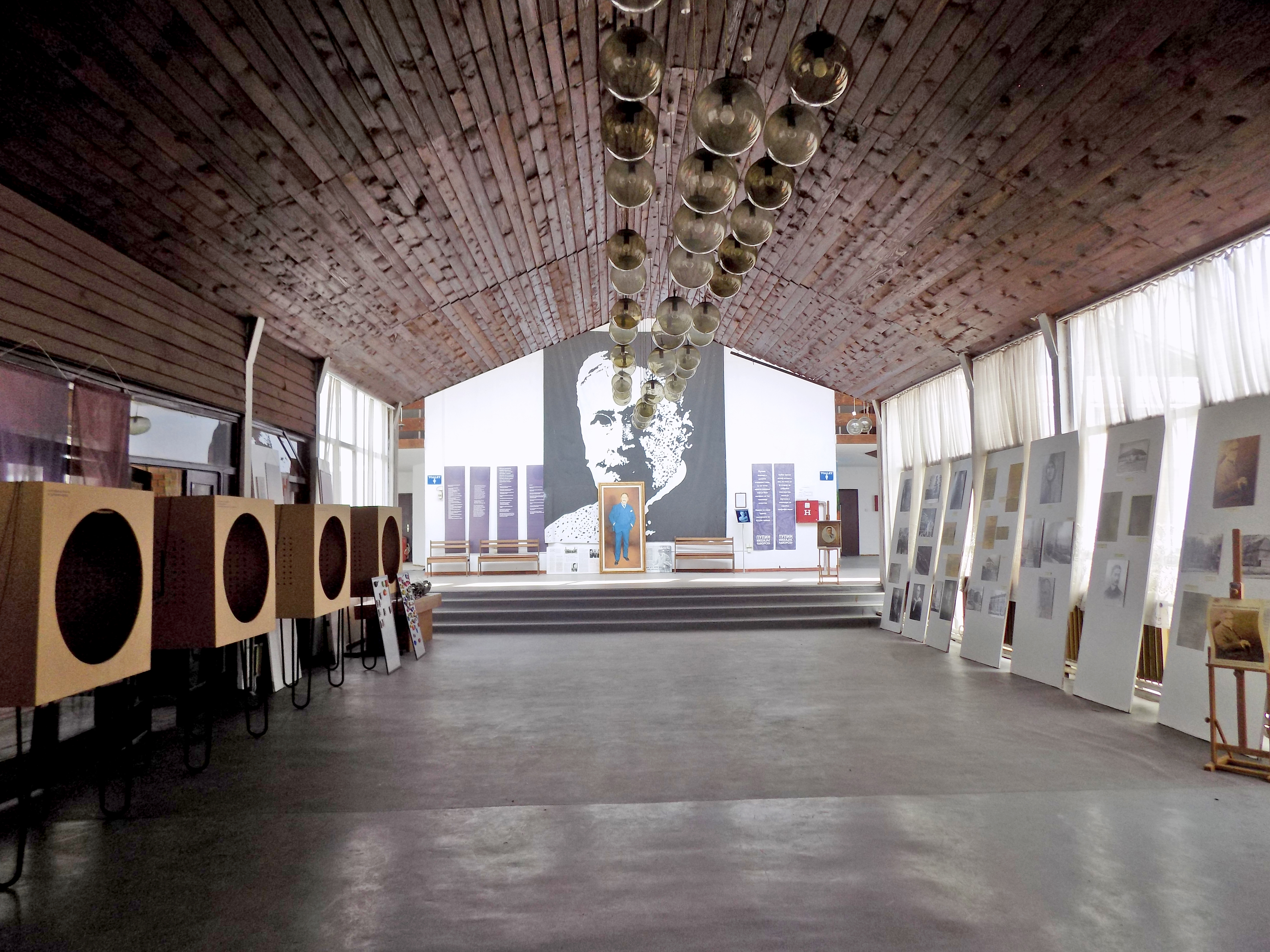
Exhibition in the new building of Cultural Center

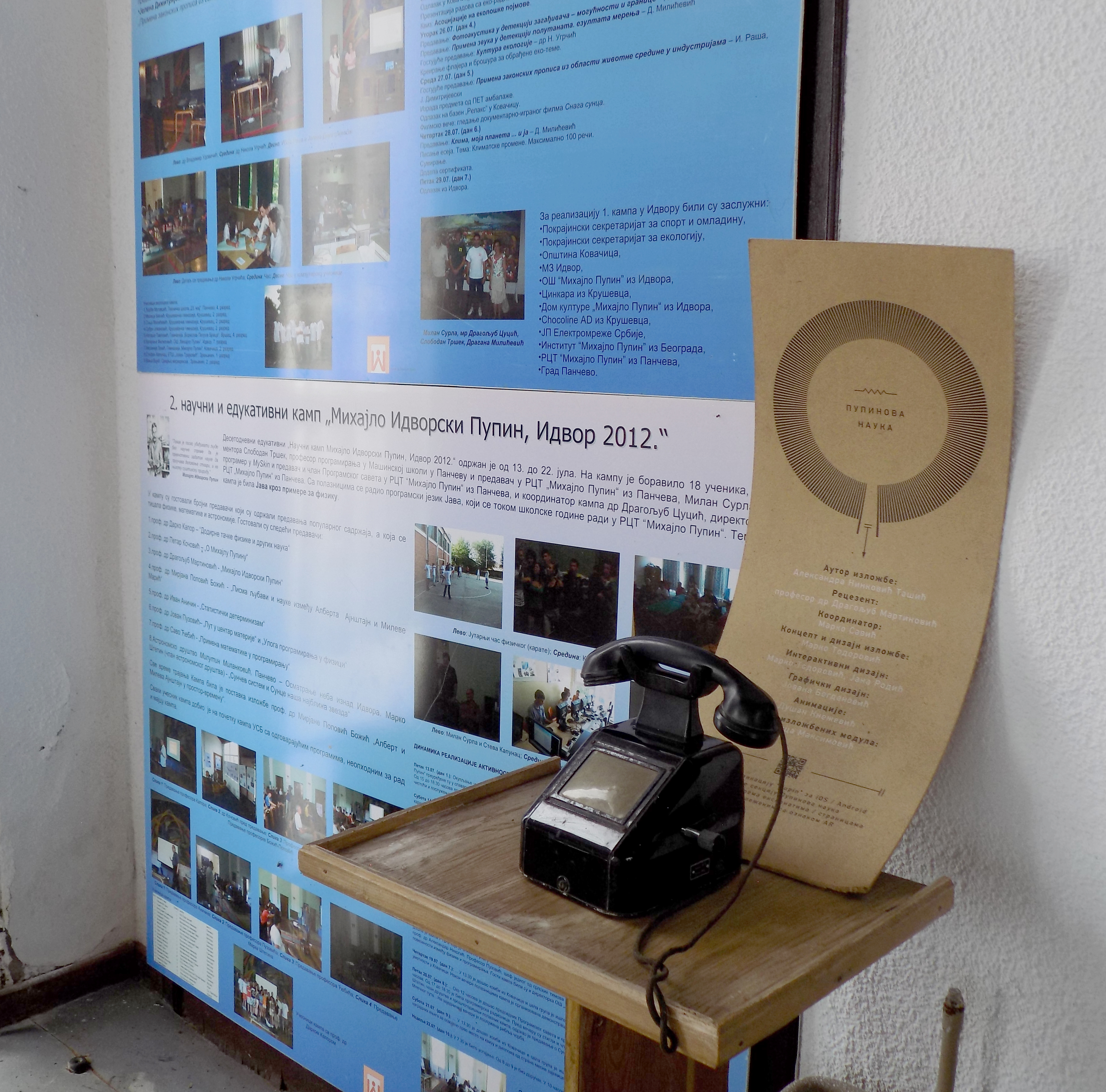
One of the exhibits, an old telephone from Pupin's time

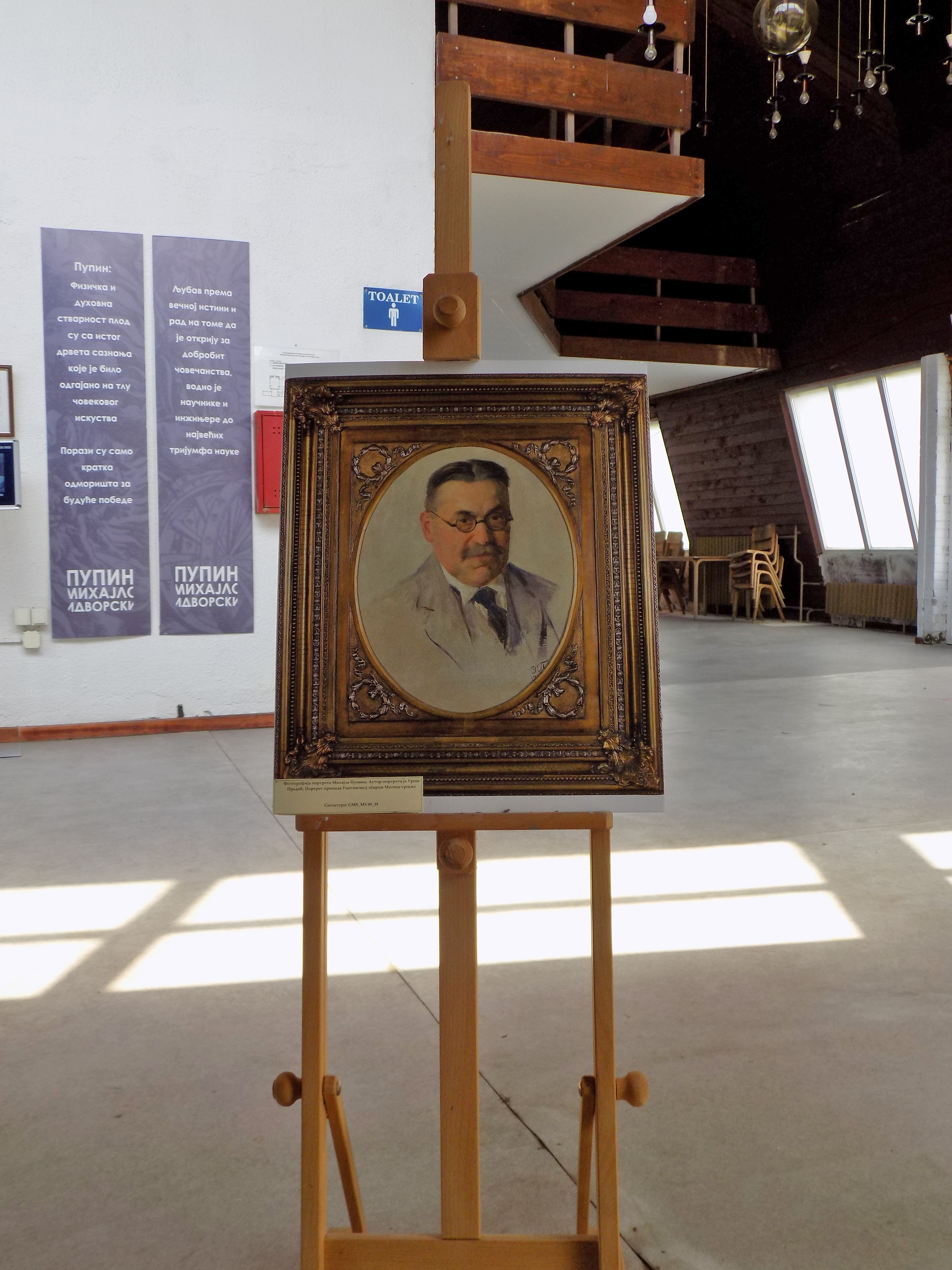
Reproduction of the Pupin's portrait, the work of Uroš Predić

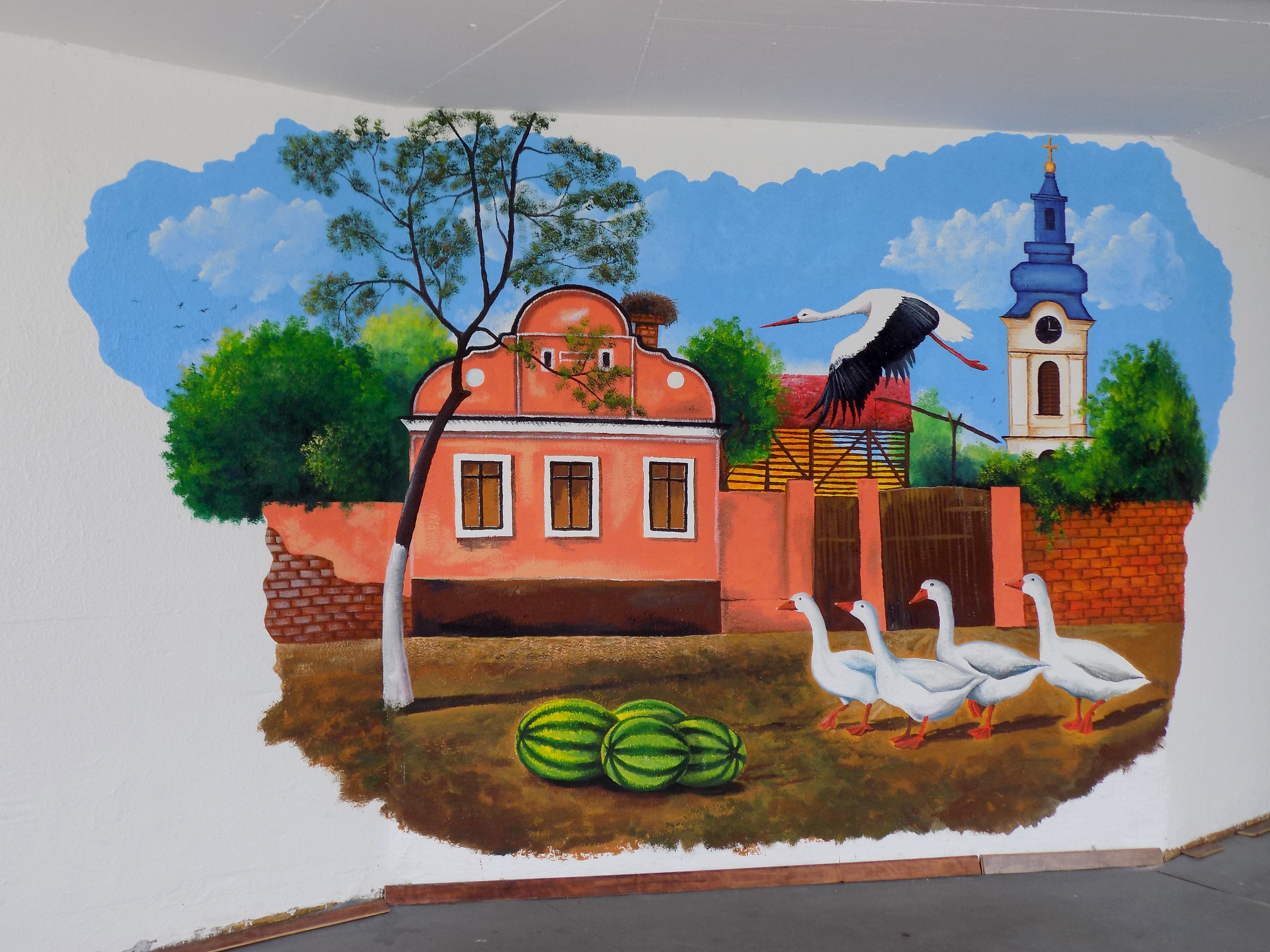
Mural in the Cultural Center, a gift from famous naive painters from Kovačica

== Tourism ==
The memorial complex in Idvor is included in the tourist offer of Serbia. The offer includes a tour of Pupin's birth house, museum exhibits in the old school and the People's House of Mihajlo I. Pupina. The tours are led by an expert guide, the curators of the Pupin Museum, who have developed a different program for different ages of visitors, which makes the visit interesting for the tourists themselves. The tourist tour of Idvor also includes the graves of Mihajlo Pupin's parents in the cemetery located at the western end of the village and the Old Cross, which is located on the site of the original settlement of Idvor, which was located north of today. The cross was erected in 1839 on the site of the old church. Every year, the Memorial Complex is visited by more than 10,000 visitors, mostly students on excursions.

== October meetings of inventors in Idvor ==
The October Meetings of Inventors have been held in Idvor since 1979. At the October Meetings, a number of awards and recognitions are given for scientific work, invention and contribution to preserving the memory of the great scientist. The awards are also given to primary and secondary school students from all over Banat who have achieved notable success at national and international competitions.

== See also ==
- List of museums in Serbia
