= Mihajlo Pupin =

Serbian-American electrical engineer and inventor (1858–1935)

- Михајло Пупин
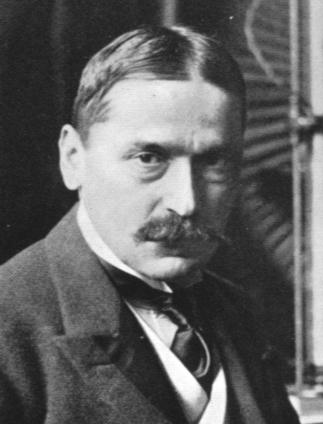
- Pupin, c. 1890
- Born: Mihajlo Idvorski Pupin; October 4, 1858; Idvor, Austrian Empire (now Serbia)
- Died: March 12, 1935 (aged 76); New York City, U.S.
- Resting place: Woodlawn Cemetery, New York City
- Other name: Michael Pupin
- Citizenship: Austria (1858–1883); United States (1883–1935)
- Education: Columbia University (BA, 1883); University of Cambridge (no degree); University of Berlin (PhD, 1889)
- Known for: Pupin coils (1899)
- Spouse: Sarah Catharine Jackson (m. 1888)
- Children: 1
- Relatives: Justina Pupin Košćal (great-granddaughter)
- Awards: Membership of NAS (1905); Elliott Cresson Medal (1905); AIEE Edison Medal (1920); IRE Medal of Honor (1924); John Fritz Medal (1932)
- Scientific career
- Fields: Physics
- Workplaces: Columbia University (1889–1931)
- Thesis: Osmotic Pressure and its Relation to Free Energy (1889)
- Doctoral advisor: Hermann von Helmholtz
- Other academic advisors: John Tyndall
- Notable students: Edwin Howard Armstrong; Robert Andrews Millikan
- Writing career
- Genre: Autobiography
- Notable work: From Immigrant to Inventor (1923)
- Notable awards: Pulitzer Prize (1924)

Signature
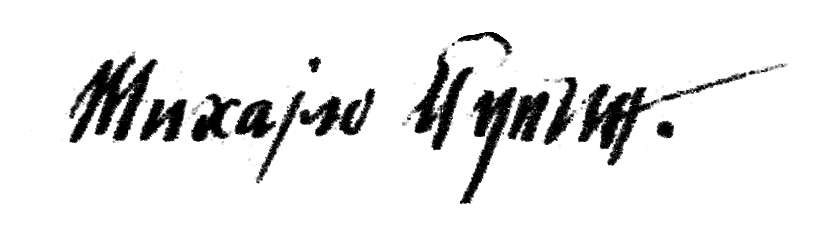

Mihajlo Idvorski Pupin (Serbian Cyrillic: Михајло Идворски Пупин, pronounced [miˈxǎjlo ˈîdʋoɾski ˈpǔpin]; October 4, 1858 – March 12, 1935), also known as Michael Pupin, was a Serbian-American electrical engineer, physicist and inventor.

Pupin is best known for his numerous patents, including a means of greatly extending the range of long-distance telephone communication by placing loading coils (of wire) at predetermined intervals along the transmitting wire (known as "pupinization"). Pupin was a founding member of National Advisory Committee for Aeronautics (NACA) on 3 March 1915, which later became NASA, and he participated in the founding of American Mathematical Society and American Physical Society.

In 1924, he won a Pulitzer Prize for his autobiography. Pupin was elected president or vice-president of the highest scientific and technical institutions, such as the American Institute of Electrical Engineers, the New York Academy of Sciences, the Radio Institute of America, and the American Association for the Advancement of Science. He was also an honorary consul of Serbia in the United States from 1912 to 1920 and played a role in determining the borders of newly formed Kingdom of Serbs, Croats and Slovenes.

== Early life and education ==
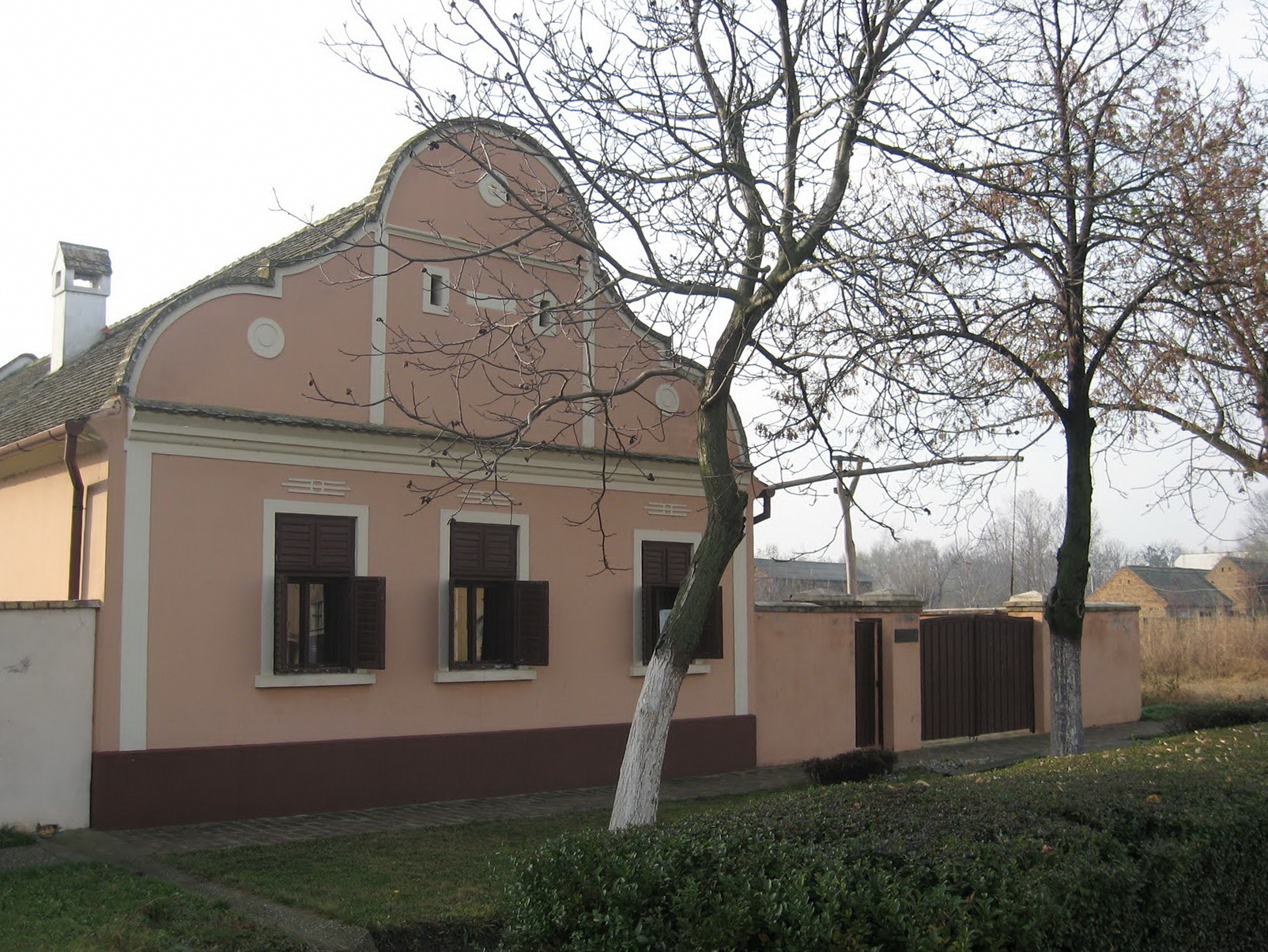
Pupin's birthplace

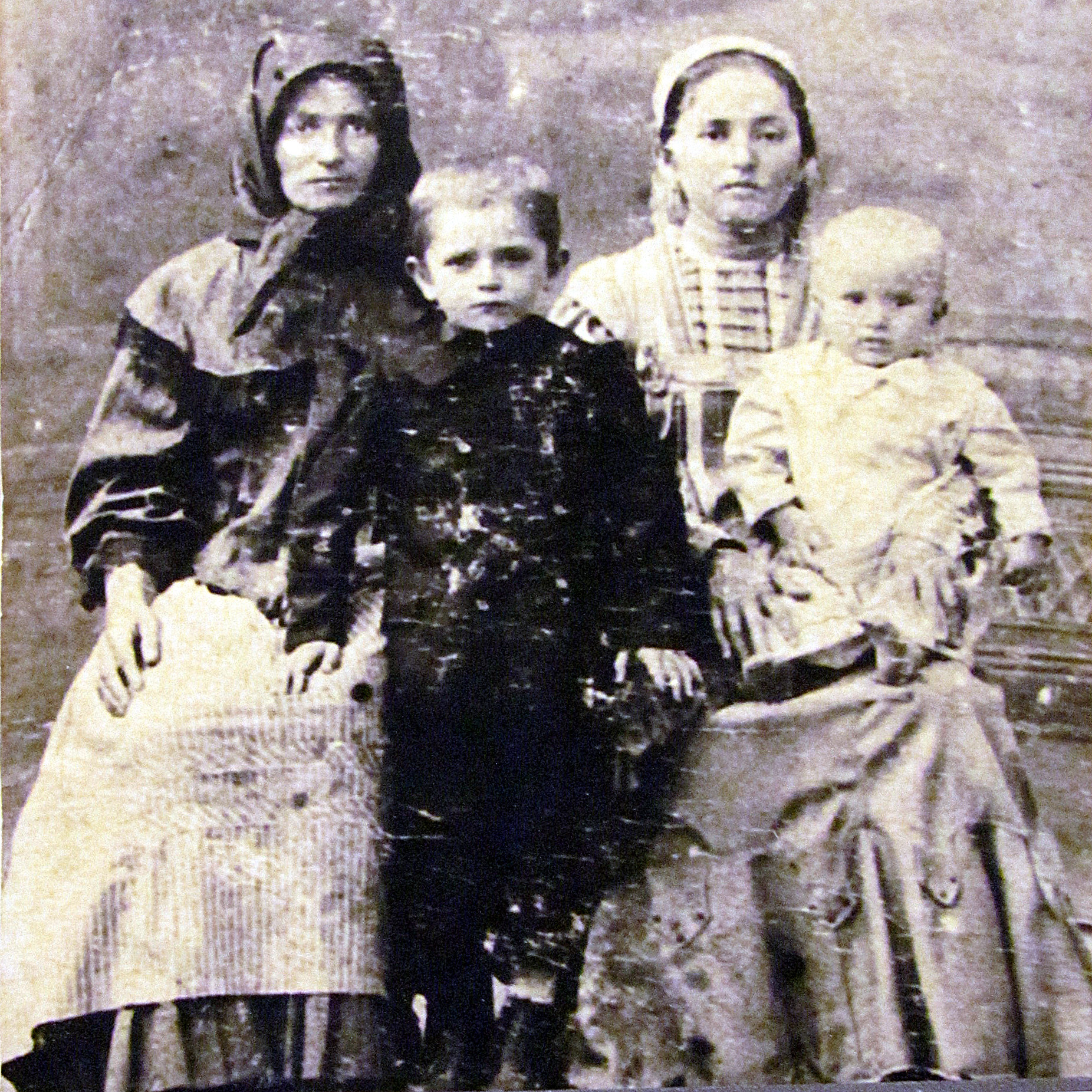
Olimpijada Pupin (left), mother of Mihajlo Pupin

Mihajlo Pupin was an ethnic Serb, born on 4 October (22 September, O.S.) in the village of Idvor (in the modern-day municipality of Kovačica, Serbia) in the region of Banat, in the Military Frontier of the Austrian Empire, 1858. He always remembered the words of his mother and cited her in his autobiography, From Immigrant to Inventor (1923):

My boy, If you wish to go out into the world about which you hear so much at the neighborhood gatherings, you must provide yourself with another pair of eyes; the eyes of reading and writing. There is so much wonderful knowledge and learning in the world which you cannot get unless you can read and write. Knowledge is the golden ladder over which we climb to heaven; knowledge is the light which illuminates our path through this life and leads to a future life of everlasting glory.

Pupin went to elementary school in his birthplace, to Serbian Orthodox school, and later to German elementary school in Perlez. He enrolled in high school in Pančevo, and later in the Real Gymnasium. He was one of the best students there; a local archpriest saw his enormous potential and talent, and influenced the authorities to give Pupin a scholarship.

Because of his activity in the "Serbian Youth" movement, which at that time had many problems with Austro-Hungarian police authorities, Pupin had to leave Pančevo. In 1872, he went to Prague, where he continued the sixth and first half of the seventh year. After his father died in March 1874, the twenty-year-old Pupin decided to cancel his education in Prague due to financial problems and to move to the United States.

When I landed at Castle Garden, forty-eight years ago, I had only five cents in my pocket. Had I brought five hundred dollars, instead of five cents, my immediate career in the new, and to me perfectly strange, land would have been the same. A young immigrant such as I was then does not begin his career until he has spent all the money which he has brought with him. I brought five cents, and immediately spent it upon a piece of prune pie, which turned out to be a bogus prune pie. It contained nothing but pits of prunes. If I had brought five hundred dollars, it would have taken me a little longer to spend it, mostly upon bogus things, but the struggle which awaited me would have been the same in each case. It is no handicap to a boy immigrant to land here penniless; it is not a handicap to any boy to be penniless when he strikes out for an independent career, provided that he has the stamina to stand the hardships that may be in store for him.

== Studies in America and Ph.D. ==
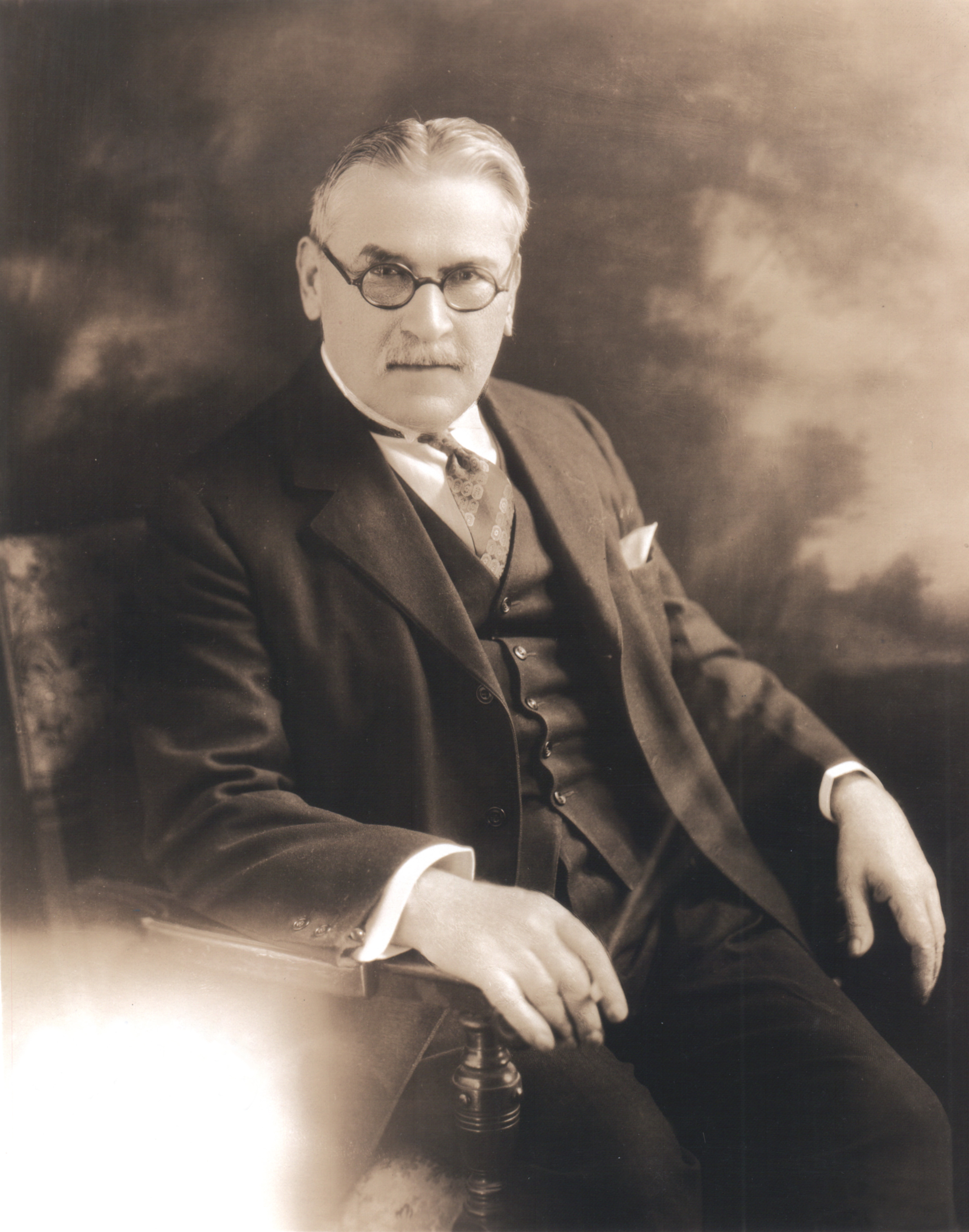
Pupin c. 1935

For the next five years in the United States, Pupin worked as a manual laborer (most notably at the biscuit factory on Cortlandt Street in Manhattan) while he learned English, Greek and Latin. He also gave private lectures. After three years of various courses, in the autumn of 1879 he successfully finished his tests and entered Columbia College, where he became known as an exceptional athlete and scholar. A friend of Pupin's predicted that his physique would make him a splendid oarsman, and that Columbia would do anything for a good oarsman. A popular student, he was elected president of his class in his Junior year. He graduated with honors in 1883 and became an American citizen at the same time.

After Pupin completed his studies, with emphasis in the fields of physics and mathematics, he returned to Europe, initially the United Kingdom (1883–1885), where he continued his schooling supervised by John Tyndall at the University of Cambridge. He obtained his Ph.D. at the University of Berlin under Hermann von Helmholtz with a dissertation titled "Osmotic Pressure and its Relation to Free Energy".

== Professor at Columbia University ==
In 1889 Pupin returned to Columbia University, where he was offered a position as "Teacher of Mathematical Physics in the Department of Electrical Engineering". Shortly afterwards he was appointed associate professor, and in 1901 professor of electromechanics. Pupin's research pioneered carrier wave detection and current analysis.

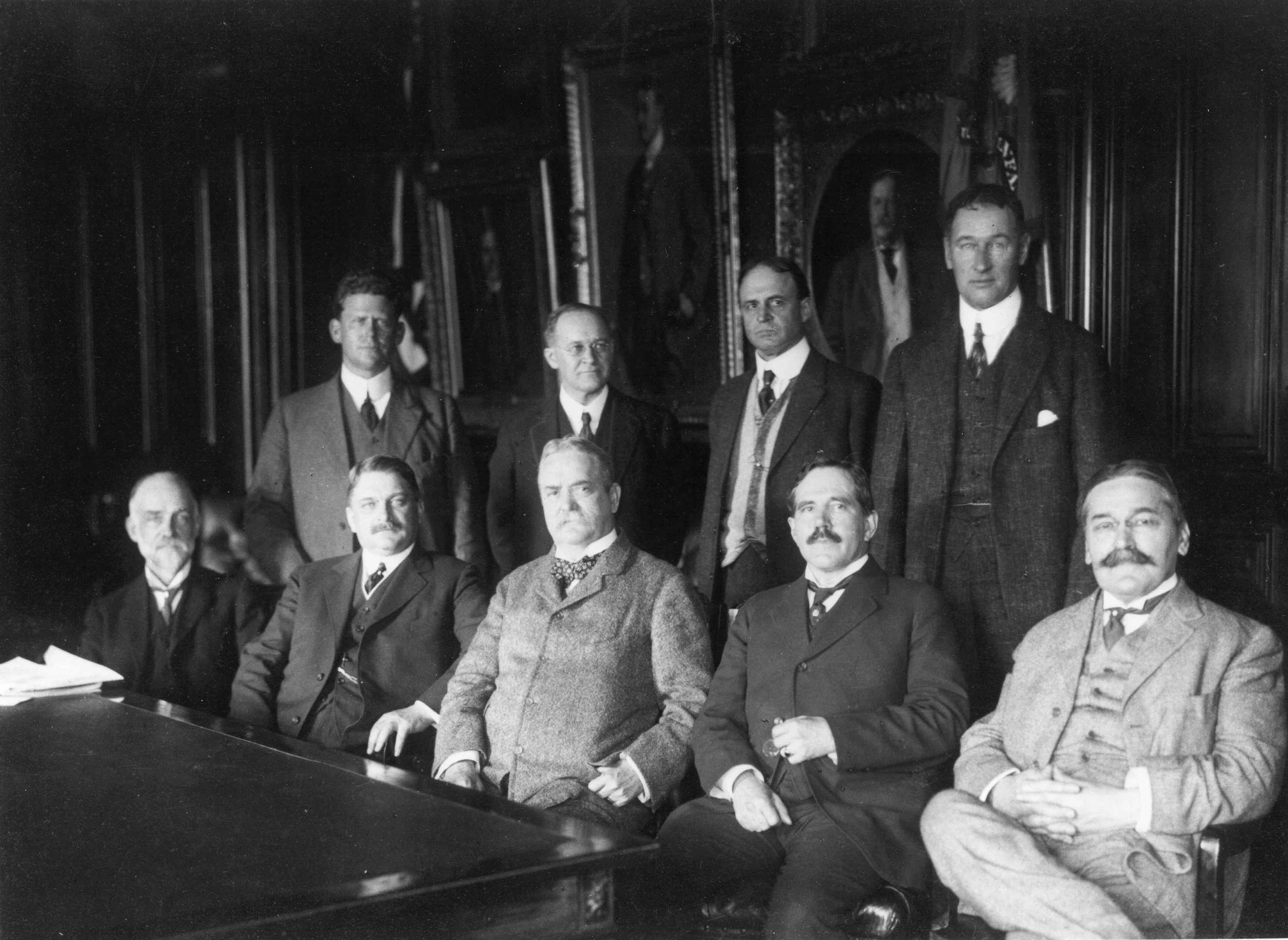
First meeting of the NACA in 1915 (Pupin seated first from right)

He was an early investigator into X-ray imaging, but his claim to have made the first X-ray image in the United States is incorrect. He learned of Röntgen's discovery of unknown rays passing through wood, paper, insulators, and thin metals leaving traces on a photographic plate, and attempted this himself. Using a vacuum tube, which he had previously used to study the passage of electricity through rarefied gases, he made successful images on 2 January 1896. Edison provided Pupin with a calcium tungstate fluoroscopic screen which, when placed in front of the film, shortened the exposure time by twenty times, from one hour to a few minutes. Based on the results of experiments, Pupin concluded that the impact of primary X-rays generated secondary X-rays. With his work in the field of X-rays, Pupin gave a lecture at the New York Academy of Sciences. He was the first person to use a fluorescent screen to enhance X-rays for medical purposes. A New York surgeon, Dr. Bull, sent Pupin a patient to obtain an X-ray image of his left hand prior to an operation to remove lead shot from a shotgun injury. The first attempt at imaging failed because the patient, a well-known lawyer, was "too weak and nervous to be stood still nearly an hour" which is the time it took to get an X-ray photo at the time. In another attempt, the Edison fluorescent screen was placed on a photographic plate and the patient's hand on the screen. X-rays passed through the patients hand and caused the screen to fluoresce, which then exposed the photographic plate. A fairly good image was obtained with an exposure of only a few seconds and showed the shot as if "drawn with pen and ink." Dr. Bull was able to take out all of the lead balls in a very short time.

== Pupin coils ==
Pupin's 1899 patent for loading coils, archaically called "Pupin coils", followed closely on the pioneering work of the English polymath Oliver Heaviside, which predates Pupin's patent by some seven years. The importance of the patent was made clear when the American rights to it were acquired by American Telephone & Telegraph (AT&T), making him wealthy. Although AT&T bought Pupin's patent, it made little use of it, as it already had its own development in hand led by George Campbell and had up to this point been challenging Pupin with Campbell's own patent. AT&T was afraid it would lose control of an invention which was immensely valuable due to its ability to greatly extend the range of long-distance telephones and especially submarine ones.

== World War I research ==
When the United States joined the First World War in 1917, Pupin was working at Columbia University, organizing a research group for submarine detection techniques. Together with his colleagues, professors Wils and Morcroft, he performed numerous experiments with the aim of discovering submarines at Key West and New London. He also conducted research in the field of establishing telecommunications between places. During the war, Pupin was a member of the state council for research and state advisory board for aeronautics. For his work he received acclamation from President Warren G. Harding, which was published on page 386 of his autobiography.

== Yugoslavia borders ==
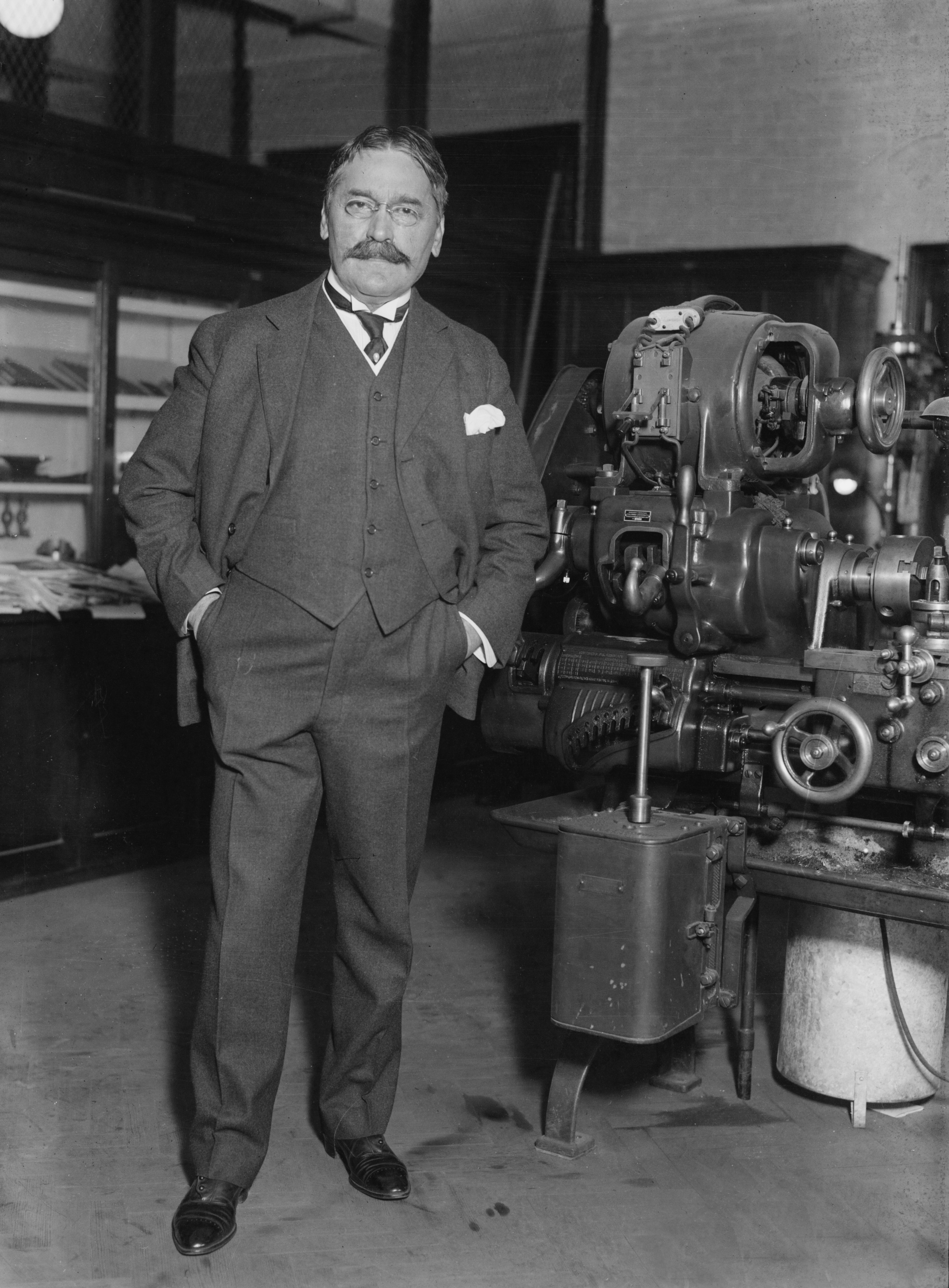
Pupin in 1916

By World War I, Pupin was as well-known for Serbian nationalism as science. He wrote that the assassination of Franz Ferdinand in June 1914 "was ... prepared in Vienna" when Austro-Hungarian rule in Bosnia and Herzegovina began in 1878. Pan-Serb ideology was, Pupin said, "a natural heritage of every true Serb". As a politically influential figure in America, Pupin participated in the final decisions of the Paris peace conference after the war, when the borders of the future kingdom (of Serbs, Croats and Slovenians) were drawn. Pupin stayed in Paris for two months during the peace talk (April–May 1919) on the insistence of the government.

My home town is Idvor, but this fact says little because Idvor can't be found on the map. That is a small village which is found near the main road in Banat, which belonged to Austro-Hungary, and now is an important part of Serbs, Croatians and Slovenians Kingdom. This province on the Paris Peace Conference in 1919, was requested by the Romanians, but their request was invalid. They could not negate the fact that the majority of the inhabitants were Serbs, especially in the Idvor area. President Wilson and Mr. Lancing knew me personally and when found out that I was originally from Banat, Romanian reasons lost its weight.

According to the London agreement from 1915. it was planned that Italy should get Dalmatia. After the secret London agreement France, England and Russia asked from Serbia some territorial concessions to Romania and Bulgaria. Romania should have gotten Banat and Bulgaria should have gotten a part of Macedonia all the way to Skoplje.

In a difficult situation during the negotiations on the borders of Yugoslavia, Pupin personally wrote a memorandum on 19 March 1919 to American president Woodrow Wilson, who, based on the data received from Pupin about the historical and ethnic characteristics of the border areas of Dalmatia, Slovenia, Istria, Banat, Međimurje, Baranja and Macedonia, stated that he did not recognize the London agreement signed between the allies and Italy.

== Mihajlo Pupin foundation ==
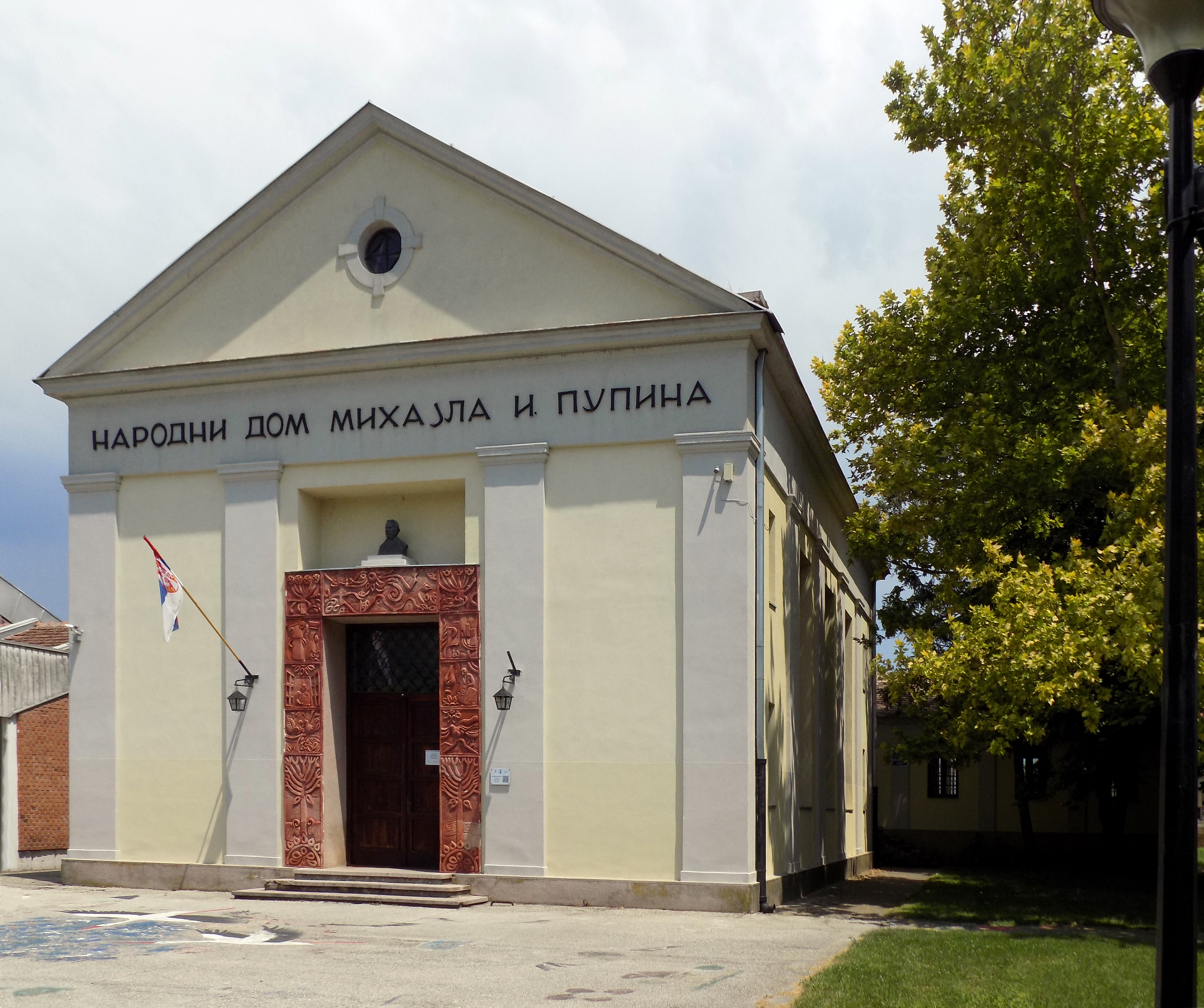
National Home Mihajlo I. Pupin, Pupin's Foundation in his hometown of Idvor (Vojvodina, Serbia). Today is the part of the Memorial Complex in Idvor, which is dedicated to the life and work of Mihajlo Pupin and protected as a cultural monument of exceptional importance.

In 1914, Pupin formed "Fund Olimpijada Aleksić-Pupin" within the Serbian Academy of Sciences and Arts to commemorate his mother Olimpijada for all the support she gave him through life. Fund assets were used for helping schools in old Serbia and Macedonia, and scholarships were awarded every year on the Saint Sava day. One street in Ohrid was named after Mihajlo Pupin in 1930 to honour his efforts. He also established a separate "Mihajlo Pupin fund" which he funded from his own property in the Kingdom of Yugoslavia, which he later gave to "Privrednik" for schooling of young people and for prizes in "exceptional achievements in agriculture", as well as for Idvor for giving prizes to pupils and to help the church district.

Thanks to Pupin's donations, the library in Idvor got a reading room, schooling of young people for agriculture sciences was founded, as well as the electrification and waterplant in Idvor. Pupin also donated over 500 publications to Belgrade University Library. His gifts included scientific books and subscriptions in preparation of the opening of the new building in 1926, and continued with numerous volumes from his private collection in 1932 and 1933. Pupin established a foundation in the National Museum of Serbia in Belgrade. The funds of the foundation were used to purchase works of Serbian artists (including Uroš Predić, Paja Jovanović, Konstantin Danil, among others) for the museum, and for the printing of certain publications. Pupin invested a million dollars in the funds of the foundation.

In 1909, he established one of the oldest Serbian emigrant organizations in the United States called "Union of Serbs – Sloga." The organization had a mission to gather Serbs in immigration and offer help, as well as keeping ethnic and cultural values. This organization later merged with three other immigrant societies.

Other emigrant organizations in to one large Serbian national foundation, and Pupin was one of its founders and a longtime president (1909–1926).

He also organized "Kolo srpskih sestara" (English: Circle of Serbian sisters) who gathered help for the Serbian Red Cross, and he also helped the gathering of volunteers to travel to Serbia during the First World War with the help of the Serbian patriotic organization called the "Serbian National Defense Council" which he founded and led. Later, at the start of the Second World War this organization was rehabilitated by Jovan Dučić and worked with the same goal. Pupin guaranteed the delivery of food supplies to Serbia with his own resources, and he also was the head of the committee that provided help to the victims of war. He also founded the Serbian society for helping children which provided medicine, clothes and shelter for war orphans.

== Literary work ==
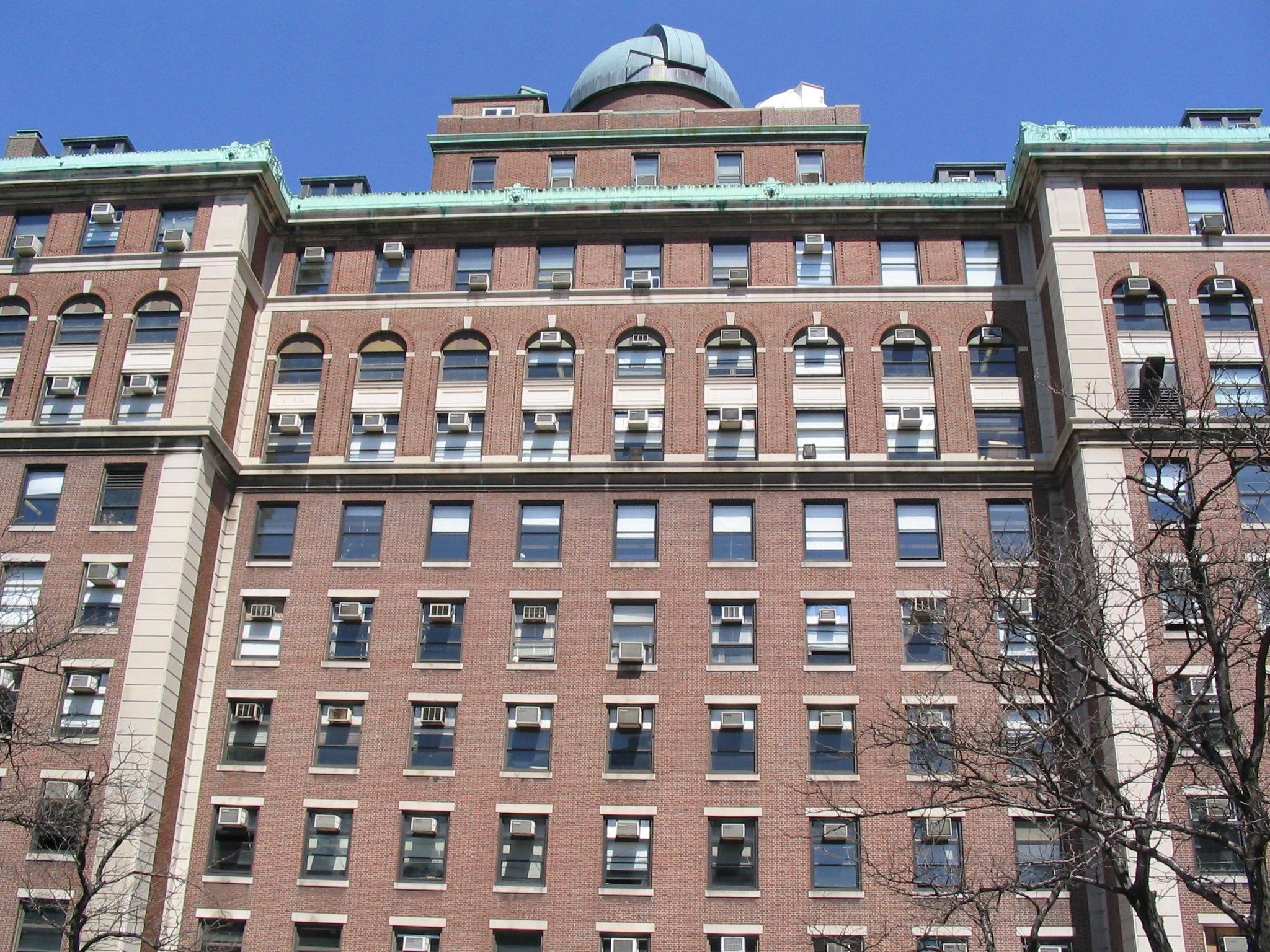
Pupin Hall at Columbia University

Besides his patents he published several dozen scientific disputes, articles, reviews and a 396-page autobiography under the name Michael Pupin, From Immigrant to Inventor (Scribner's, 1923). He won the annual Pulitzer Prize for Biography or Autobiography. It was published in Serbian in 1929 under the title From pastures to scientist (Od pašnjaka do naučenjaka). Beside this he also published:

- Pupin Michael: Der Osmotische Druck und Seine Beziehung zur Freien Energie, Inaugural Dissertation zur Erlangung der Doctorwurde, Buchdruckerei von Gustav Shade, Berlin, June 1889.
- Pupin Michael: Thermodynamics of Reversible Cycles in Gases and Saturated Vapors, John Wiley & Sons. 1894.
- Pupin Michael: Serbian Orthodox Church (South Slav Monuments) J. Murray. London, 1918.
- Pupin Michael: Yugoslavia. (In Association for International Conciliation Amer. Branch —Yugoslavia). American Association for International Conciliation. 1919.
- Pupin Michael: The New Reformation; from Physical to Spiritual Realities, Scribner, New York, 1927.
- Pupin Michael: Romance of the Machine, Scribner, New York, 1930.
- Pupin Michael: Discussion by M. Pupin and other prominent engineers in Toward Civilization, edited by C. A. Beard. Longmans, Green & Co. New York, 1930.

== Pupin Hall ==
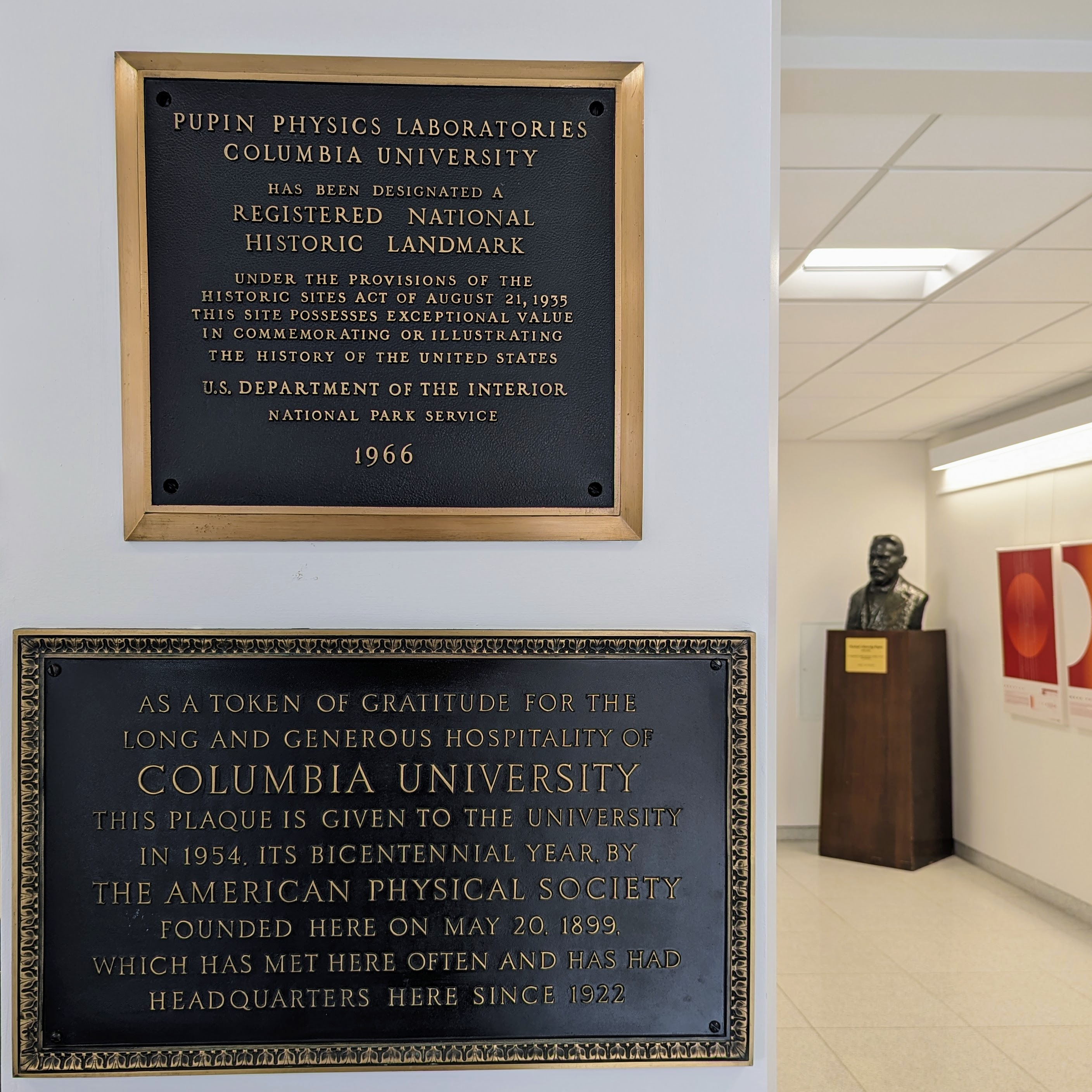
Pupin Physics Laboratories at Columbia University

Columbia University's Physical Laboratories building, built in 1927, is named Pupin Hall in his honor. It houses the physics and astronomy departments of the university. During Pupin's tenure, Harold C. Urey, in his work with the hydrogen isotope deuterium demonstrated the existence of heavy water, the first major scientific breakthrough in the newly founded laboratories (1931). In 1934 Urey was awarded the Nobel Prize in Chemistry for the work he performed in Pupin Hall related to his discovery of "heavy hydrogen".

== Patents ==
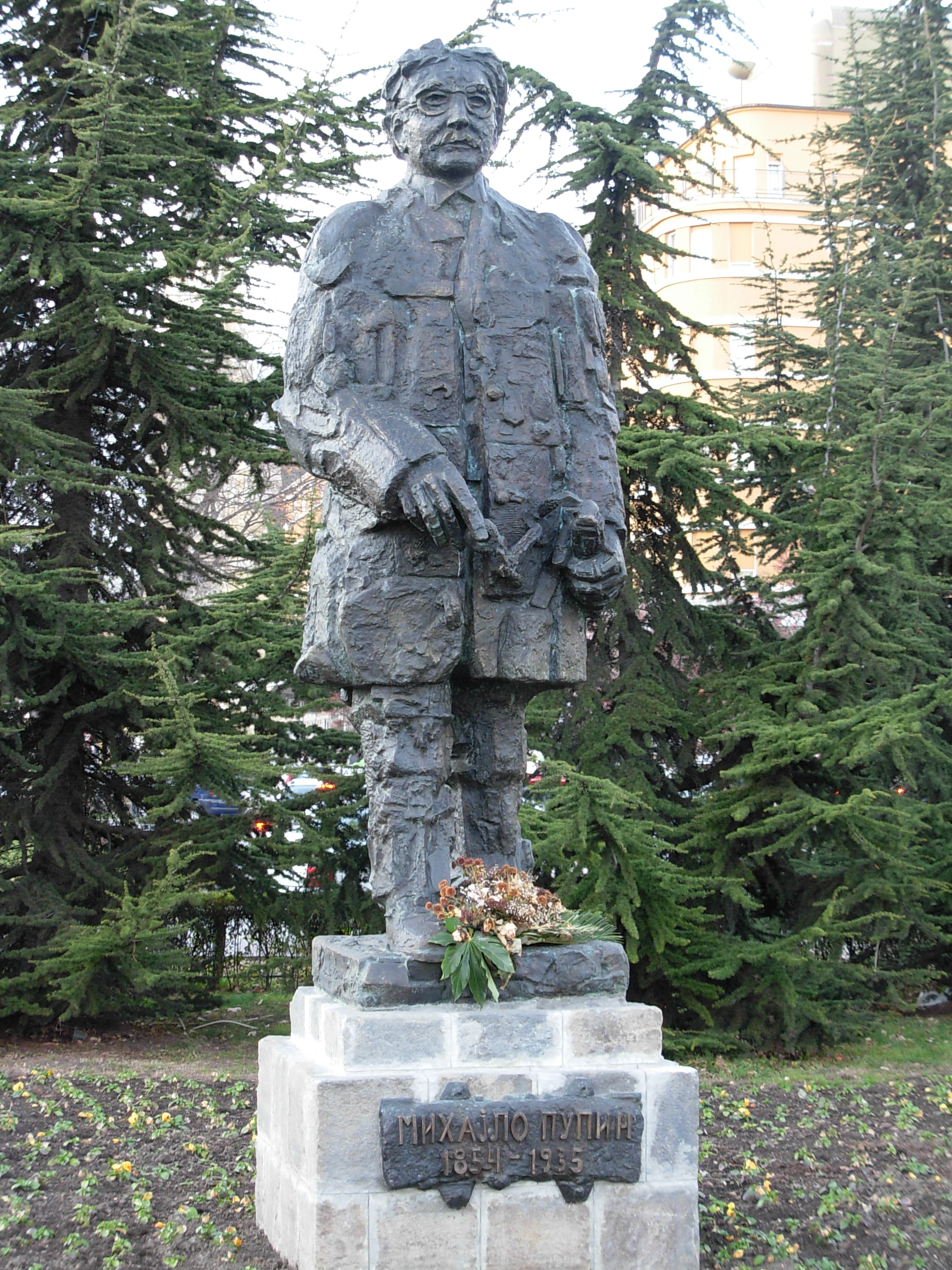
Statue of Pupin in Novi Sad

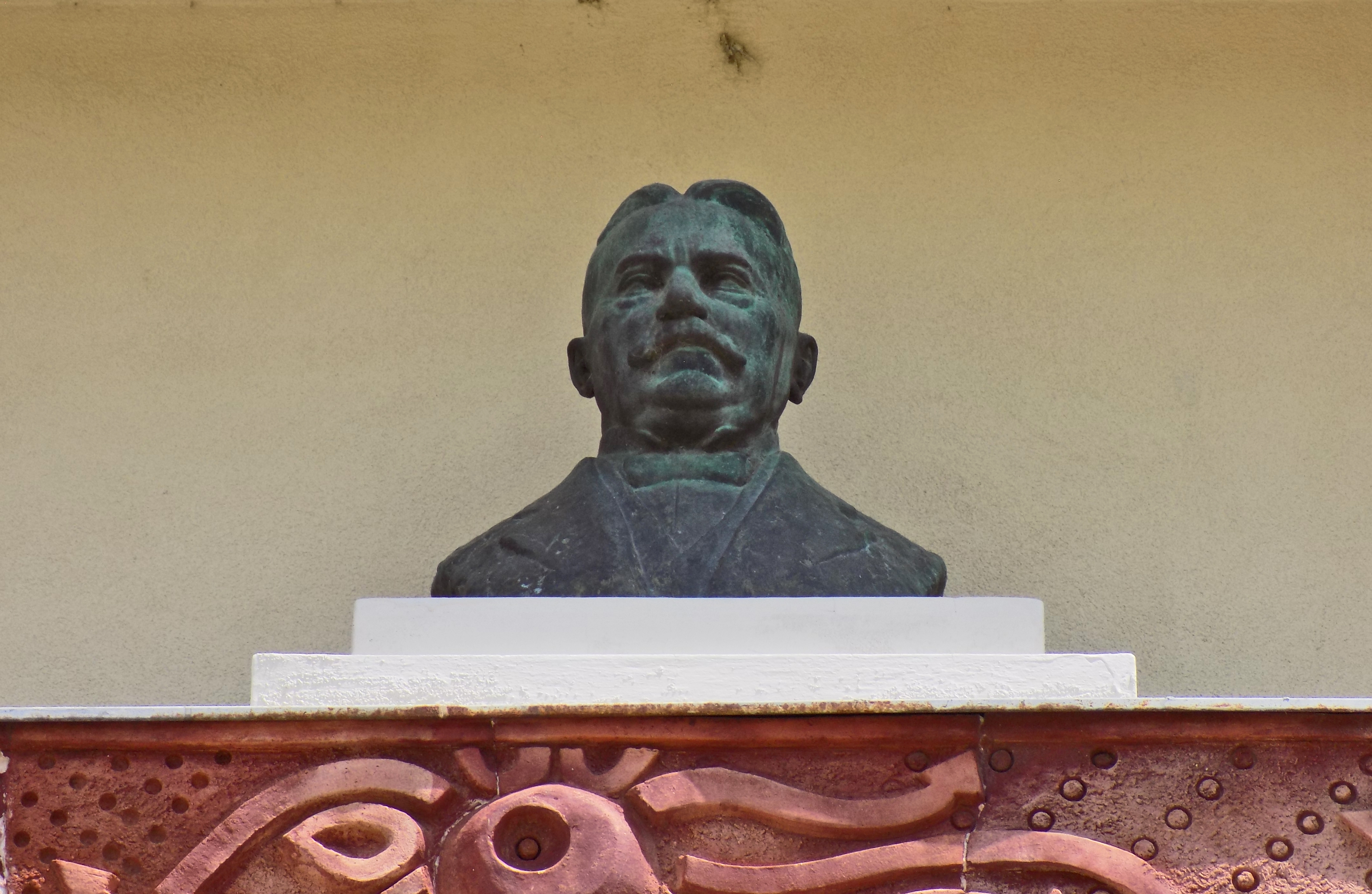
Pupin's bust above the entrance of the National Home in Idvor, the work of sculptor Ivan Meštrović

Pupin released about 70 technical articles and reviews and 34 patents.

Patents released in America
Number of patent	Date
U.S. patent 519,346 Apparatus for telegraphic or telephonic transmission	8 May 1894
U.S. patent 519,347 Transformer for telegraphic, telephonic or other electrical systems	8 May 1894
U.S. patent 640,515 Art of distributing electrical energy by alternating currents	2 January 1900
U.S. patent 640,516 Electrical transmission by resonance circuits	2 January 1900
U.S. patent 652,230 Art of reducing attenuation of electrical waves and apparatus therefore	19 June 1900
U.S. patent 652,231 Method of reducing attenuation of electrical waves and apparatus therefore	19 June 1900
U.S. patent 697,660 Winding-machine	15 April 1902
U.S. patent 707,007 Multiple telegraphy	12 August 1902
U.S. patent 707,008 Multiple telegraphy	12 August 1902
U.S. patent 713,044 Producing asymmetrical currents from symmetrical alternating electromotive process	4 November 1902
U.S. patent 768,301 Wireless electrical signalling	23 August 1904
U.S. patent 761,995 Apparatus for reducing attenuation of electric waves	7 June 1904
U.S. patent 1,334,165 Electric wave transmission	16 March 1920
U.S. patent 1,336,378 Antenna with distributed positive resistance	6 April 1920
U.S. patent 1,388,877 Sound generator	3 December 1921
U.S. patent 1,388,441 Multiple antenna for electrical wave transmission	23 December 1921
U.S. patent 1,415,845 Selective opposing impedance to received electrical oscillation	9 May 1922
U.S. patent 1,416,061 Radio receiving system having high selectivity	10 May 1922
U.S. patent 1,456,909 Wave conductor	29 May 1922
U.S. patent 1,452,833 Selective amplifying apparatus	24 April 1923
U.S. patent 1,446,769 Aperiodic pilot conductor	23 February 1923
U.S. patent 1,488,514 Selective amplifying apparatus	1 April 1923
U.S. patent 1,494,803 Electrical tuning	29 May 1923
U.S. patent 1,503,875 Tone producing radio receiver	29 April 1923

== Honors and tributes ==
Mihajlo Pupin was:

Titles

- President of the Institute of Radio Engineers, US (1917)
- President of American Institute of Electrical Engineers (1925–26)
- President of American Association for the Advancement of Science
- President of New York Academy of Sciences

Memberships

- Honorary member of German Electrical Society
- Honorary member of American Institute of Electrical Engineers
- Member of National Academy of Sciences
- Member of French Academy of Sciences
- Member of Serbian Academy of Sciences and Arts
- Member of American Mathematical Society
- Member of American Philosophical Society
- Member of American Physical Society

Degrees

- Doctor of science, Columbia University (1904)
- Honorable doctor of science, Johns Hopkins University (1915)
- Doctor of science, Princeton University (1924)
- Honorable doctor of science, New York University (1924)
- Honorable doctor of science, Muhlenberg College (1924)
- Doctor of engineering, Case School of Applied Science (1925)
- Doctor of science, George Washington University (1925)
- Doctor of science, Union College (1925)
- Honorable doctor of science, Marietta College (1926)
- Honorable doctor of science, University of California (1926)
- Doctor of science, Rutgers University (1926)
- Honorable doctor of science, Delaware University (1926)
- Honorable doctor of science, Canyon College (1926)
- Doctor of science, Brown University (1927)
- Doctor of science, University of Rochester (1927)
- Honorable doctor of science, Middlebury College (1928)
- Doctor of science, University of Belgrade (1929)
- Doctor of science, University of Prague (1929)

Medals

- Eliot Kresson Medal, Franklin Institute (1902)
- Herbert award, French Academy of Sciences (1916)
- IEEE Edison Medal, American Institute of Electrical Engineers (now IEEE) (1919)
- Honorable medal, American Radio Institute (1924)
- IEEE Medal of Honor (1924)
- George Washington Award, Western Society of Engineers (1928)
- White eagle, first degree, Kingdom of Yugoslavia (1929)
- Order of the White Lion of Czechoslovakia (1929)
- John Fritz Medal, American Association of Engineering Societies (1931)[17]

Other

- Pupin was pictured on the old 50 million Yugoslav dinar banknote.
- Home page world web browser Google has been dedicated on 9 October 2011, to 157th birth anniversary of scientist Mihajlo Pupin. On the drawing in honor of the Pupin birth symbolically represented as a boy and a girl with two different hills talking on the phone.
- The Central Radio Institute was renamed the Telecommunication and Automation Institute "Mihailo Pupin" in his honor in 1956.
- A small lunar impact crater, in the eastern part of the Mare Imbrium, was named in his honor.
- He also served on the board of trustees for Science Service, now known as Society for Science & the Public, from 1926 to 1929.
- Honorary citizen, cities of Zrenjanin, Ohrid and Municipality of Bled
- Various streets across Serbia are named after him, including major boulevards in the cities of Belgrade and Novi Sad
- Numerous schools in Serbia are named after him, including the Tenth Belgrade Gymnasium – Mihajlo Pupin, and Mihajlo Pupin Technical Department of the University of Novi Sad, located in Zrenjanin
- A road bridge over the Danube River in Belgrade was named Pupin Bridge in his honor after the vote of the citizens
- He is included in The 100 most prominent Serbs

== Private life ==
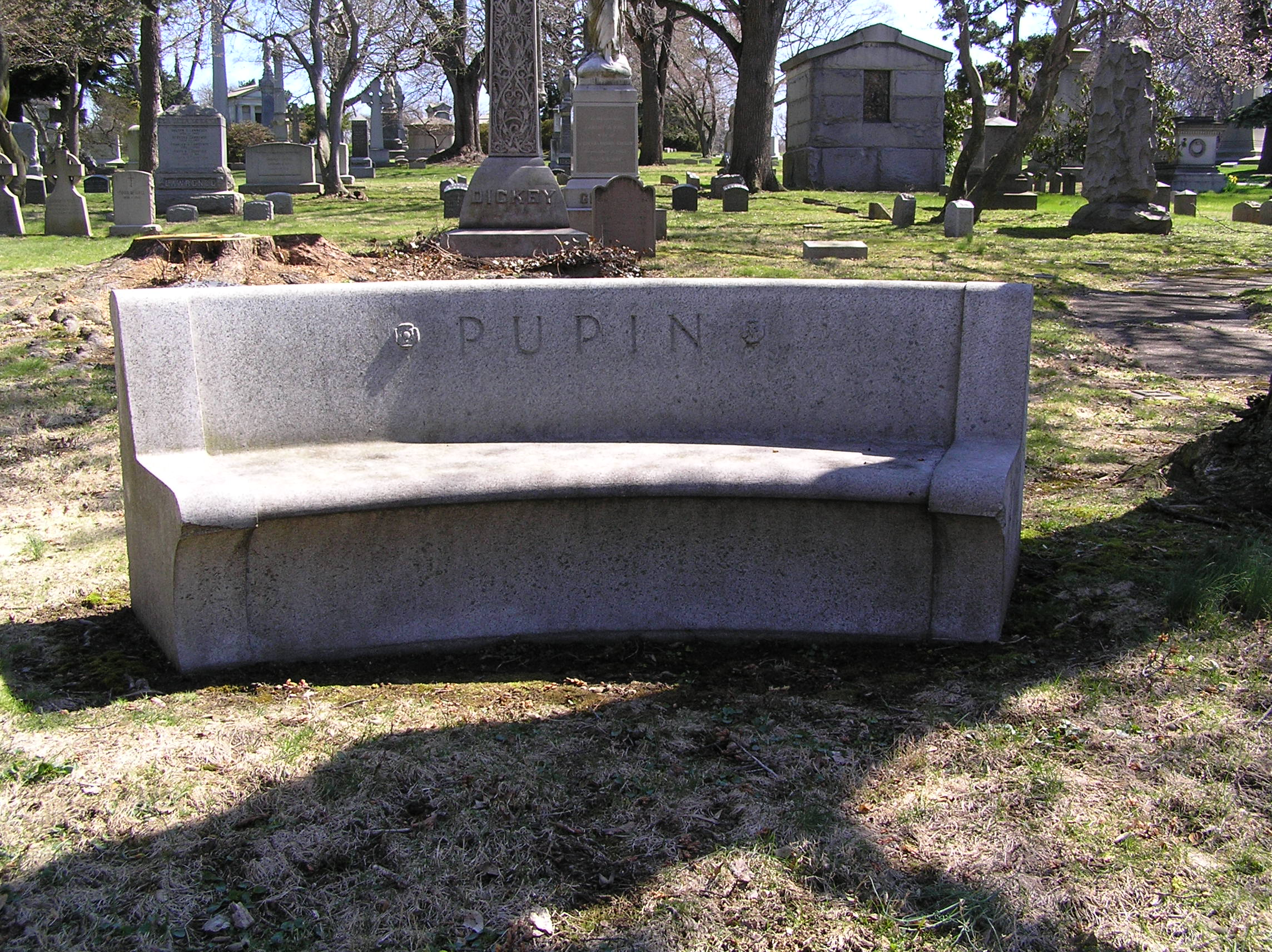
Pupin's burial site in Woodlawn Cemetery

After going to America, he changed his name to Michael Idvorsky Pupin, stressing his origin. His father was named Constantine and mother Olimpijada and Pupin had four brothers and five sisters. In 1888 he married American Sarah Catharine Jackson from New York, with whom he had a daughter named Barbara Ivanka Pupin who was born in 1899 in Yonkers, New York, and died on August 2, 1962, in New York. Pupin and his wife were married for eight years; she died from pneumonia at the age of 37.

Pupin owned an estate and farm in Norfolk, Connecticut. He wrote about it as his "real American home", because he "never had a desire to seek a better haven of happiness in any other place".

Pupin was a devoted Orthodox Christian and was the chief financial benefactor of St. Sava Monastery founded in 1923.

Mihajlo Pupin died in New York City in 1935 at age 76 and was interred at Woodlawn Cemetery, Bronx.

== See also ==
- List of Serbs
- Nikola Tesla
- List of science and religion scholars
- Memorial Complex in Idvor (Mihajlo Pupin)
