= Idvor =

Idvor Идвор
- Village (Selo)
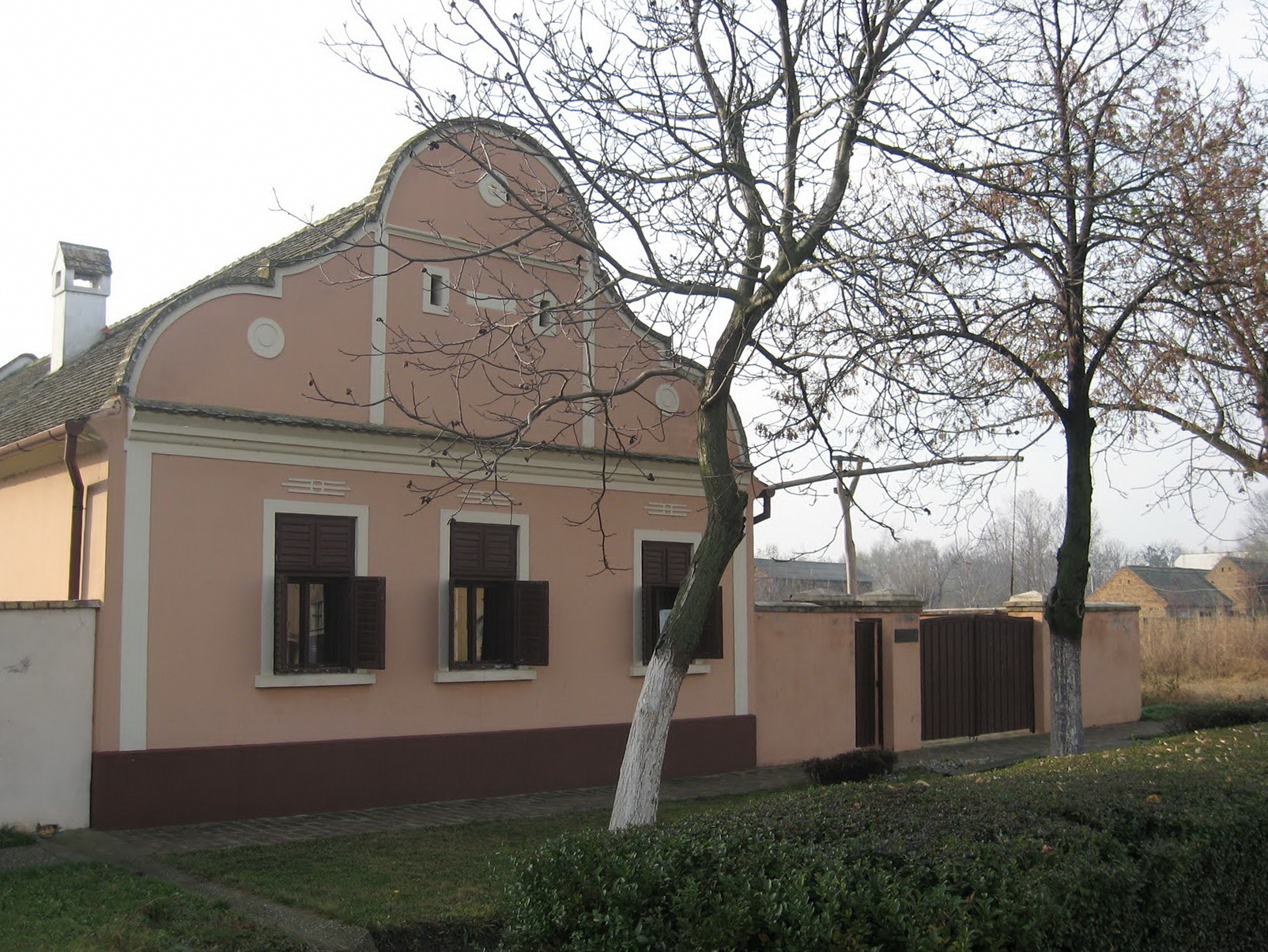
- Mihajlo Pupin's birth house

- Location of Idvor within Serbia Idvor (Serbia) Idvor (Europe)
- Coordinates: 45°11′12″N 20°30′31″E
- Country: Serbia
- Province: Vojvodina
- District: South Banat
- Municipality: Kovačica
- Elevation: 61 m (200 ft)

Population (2002)
  - Idvor: 1,198
- Time zone: UTC+1 (CET)
  - Summer (DST): UTC+2 (CEST)
- Postal code: 26207
- Area code: +381(0)13
- Car plates: PA

Idvor (Serbian Cyrillic: Идвор) is a village in northern Serbia. It is located in the Kovačica municipality, South Banat District, Vojvodina province. The village has a Serb ethnic majority (93.98%) and its population numbers 1,198 people (2002 census).

== Name ==
In Serbian, the village is known as Idvor (Идвор), in German as Idwor, and in Hungarian as Torontáludvar. The town's name originates from Hyd Var, which means "Guard near border crossing" in Hungarian.

== Geography ==
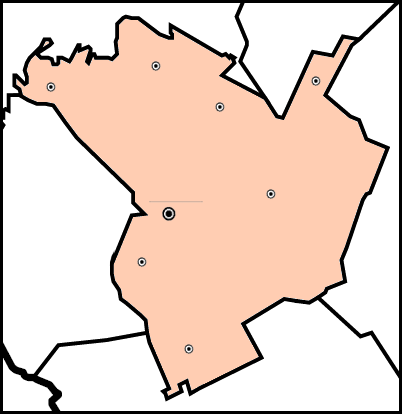

Idvor is situated near the Tamiš river, 35km from Zrenjanin and 43km from Pančevo, in the Banat region of Serbia.

== History ==
During Ottoman rule (in 1660/66), Idvor was populated by ethnic Serbs. Another wave of Serbs came to the town near the end of the 17th century during the Great Migrations, led by Arsenije III Crnojević. The Serbs arrived from Patriarchate of Peć region to serve as guardians of the Austrian military frontier against the Ottomans. Until 1795 the village was situated at location known as "Staro selo", and in that year it was moved to its current position to take advantage of a more favorable terrain.

The Serbian Orthodox Church in Idvor was built in 1803, with additions of clock, bells, and improvements to the tower over following decades. The iconostasis was installed in 1871 and painted by Stevan Todorović during 1876–1879.

== Historical population ==
- 1961: 1,823
- 1971: 1,621
- 1981: 1,442
- 1991: 1,308
- 2002: 1,198

== Notable residents ==
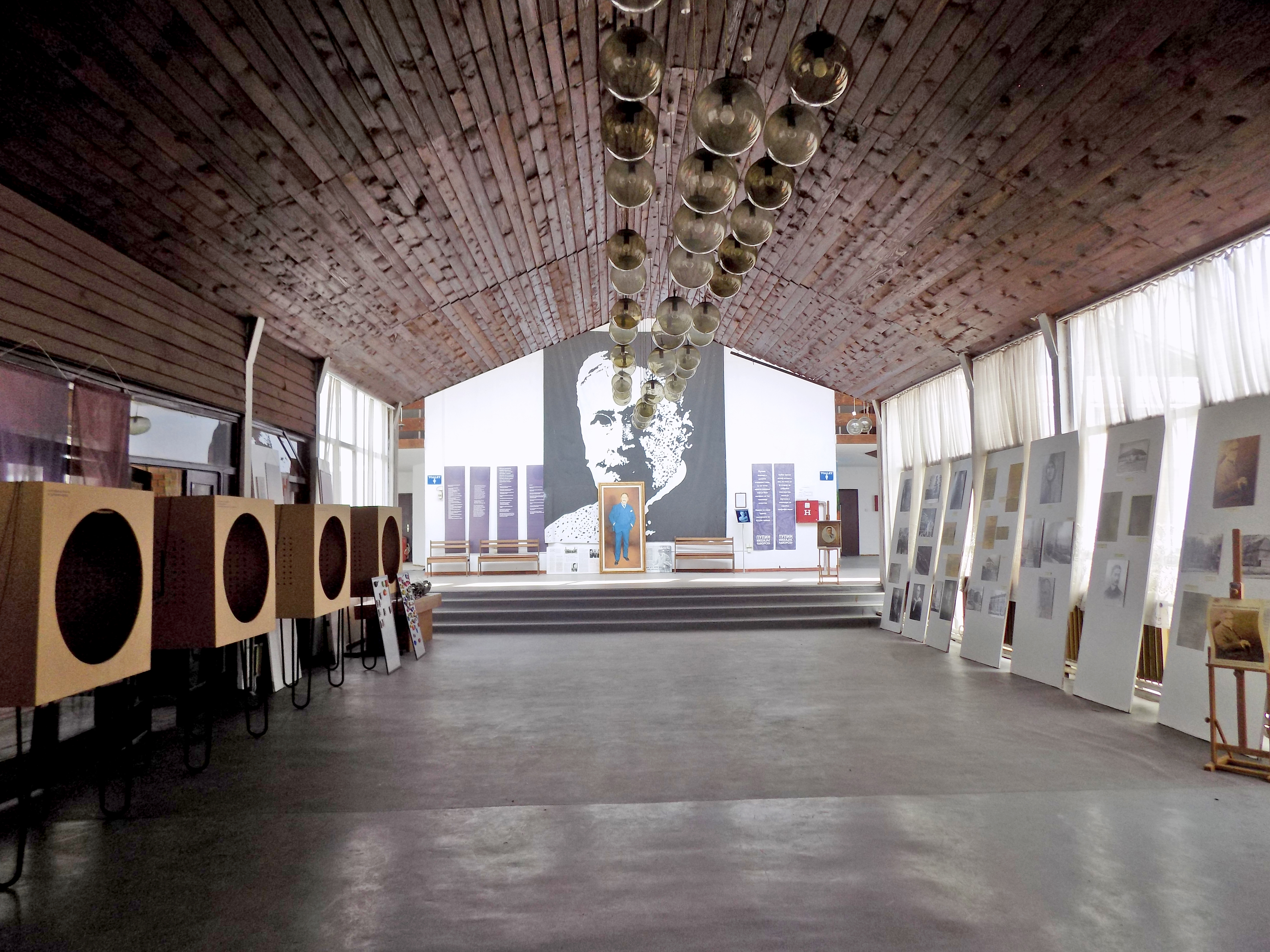
Memorial Complex of Mihajlo Pupin in Idvor

Serbian physicist, inventor, and philanthropist Mihajlo Pupin was born in Idvor. The Memorial Complex in Idvor is dedicated to his life and work. It consists of Mihajlo Pupin's home, the Old School (elementary school that he attended), and the National Home that he endowed to ldvor and its people, which was supposed to become a National University. The Complex gained the status of a Monument of Culture of Exceptional Importance in 1990.

== See also ==
- List of places in Serbia
- List of cities, towns and villages in Vojvodina
