= Justina Pupin Košćal =

Serbian politician

- Јустина Пупин Кошћал

Member of the National Assembly of the Republic of Serbia
- In office 3 August 2020 – 1 August 2022

Personal details
- Born: 1983 (age 42–43)
- Party: SPS

Justina Pupin Košćal (Serbian Cyrillic: Јустина Пупин Кошћал; born 1983) is a Serbian politician. She served in the Serbian parliament from 2020 to 2022 as a member of the Socialist Party of Serbia (SPS).

She is the great-granddaughter of the famed Serbian-American scientist and inventor Mihajlo Pupin.

== Private career ==
Pupin Košćal is a professor of sports and physical education. Before entering political life, she built a successful private career in Dubai and for a time lived between Dubai and Belgrade. She returned to Serbia on a permanent basis after being asked to become involved in a project commemorating important dates in Serbian-American relations. At the time of her election to parliament, she lived in Pančevo.

== Politician ==
Pupin Košćal received the eighth position on the Socialist Party's electoral list in the 2020 Serbian parliamentary election and was elected when the list won thirty-two seats. The SPS continued its participation in a coalition government led by the Serbian Progressive Party (SNS) after the election, and Pupin Košćal served as part of the ministry's parliamentary majority.

During her parliamentary term, she was deputy chair of the committee on the diaspora and Serbs in the region; a deputy member of the defence and internal affairs committee, the culture and information committee, and the security services control committee; a deputy member of Serbia's delegation to the Parliamentary Assembly of the Organization for Security and Co-operation in Europe (OSCE PA); the leader of Serbia's parliamentary friendship groups with the Dominican Republic and Myanmar; and a member of the friendship groups with Bahrain, Cyprus, Egypt, Greece, Italy, Romania, Russia, Spain, the United Arab Emirates, the United Kingdom, and the United States of America.

In October 2021, Pupin Košçal called for a monument to Mihajlo Pupin to be constructed in Belgrade. In April 2022, she was one of the authors of an exhibition called, "Serbian volunteers from the USA - the contribution of Pupin and Wilson in the mobilization," commemorating the role of Serbian-American soldiers in the Thessaloniki Front in World War I.

While serving in parliament, she was a personal fitness trainer to other SPS assembly members.

Pupin Košćal appeared in the fifty-third position on the Socialist Party's list for the 2022 Serbian parliamentary election and was not re-elected when the list won thirty-one seats.
