= From Immigrant to Inventor =

Autobiography by Mihajlo Pupin (1924)

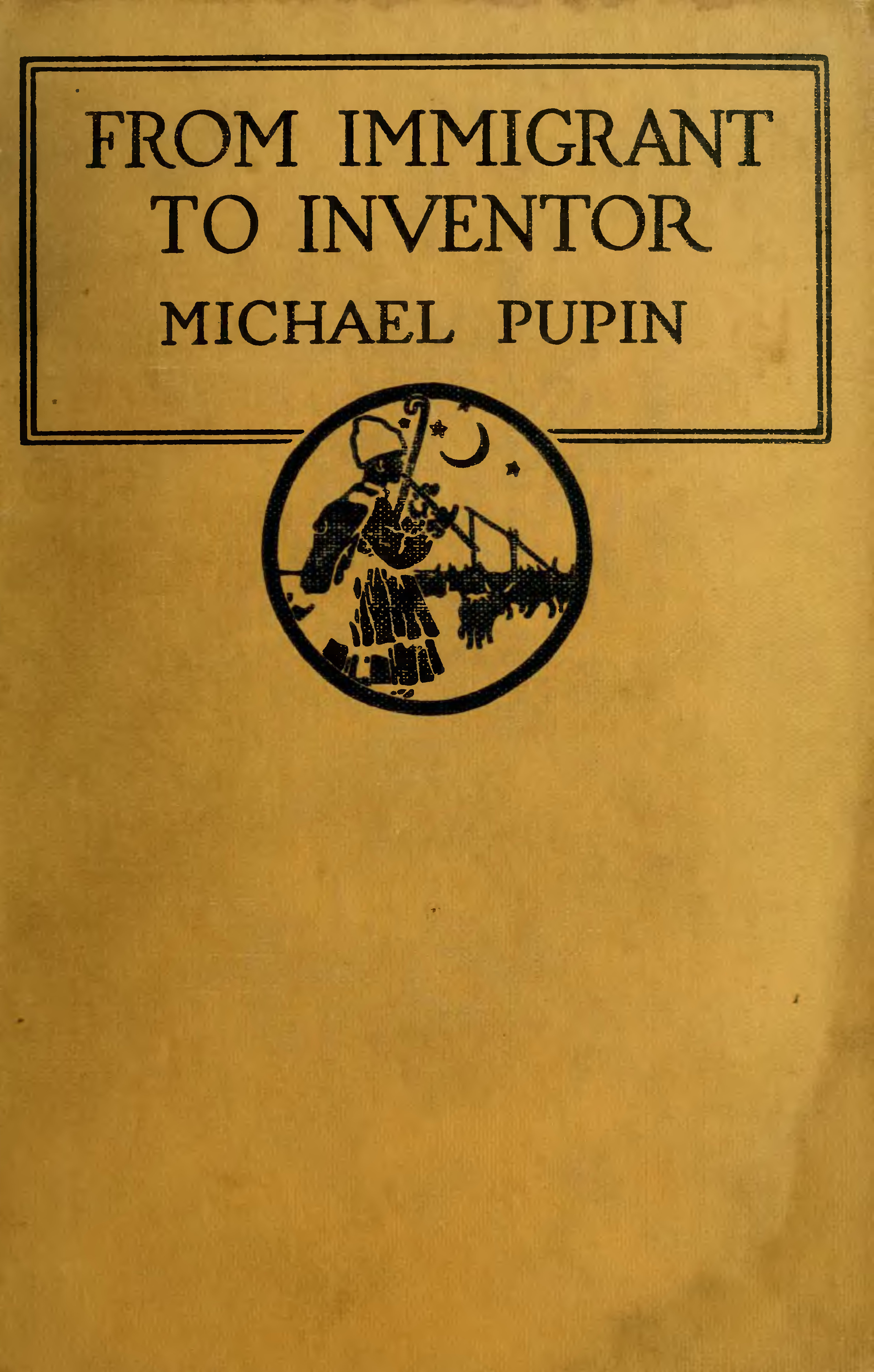
- Front cover of the first edition
- Author: Mihajlo Pupin
- Language: English
- Genre: Autobiography
- Publisher: Charles Scribner's Sons
- Publication date: 1923
- Publication place: United States
- Pages: 396
- Text: From Immigrant to Inventor at Wikisource

From Immigrant to Inventor is an autobiography by Mihajlo Pupin that won the 1924 Pulitzer Prize for Biography.

== Description ==
Pupin's book chronicles a lifelong journey of a boy from rural Serbia, who became one of the greatest scientists of the early 20th century.

The autobiography includes Pupin's childhood years in Banat, early immigrant struggles in the New York area, undergraduate studies at Columbia University, doctoral studies at the University of Cambridge and University of Berlin, and later life as a professor and researcher at Columbia University, where he made important discoveries in the fields of X-ray physics and telecommunications. It also reflects on his experience in various scientific and technical organizations, such as the American Institute of Electrical Engineers, American Mathematical Society, and American Physical Society, among others.

The book was first published in Serbia in 1929, in translation by M. Jevtić, titled "Sa pašnjaka do naučenjaka". It was also translated to other languages, including German, French, Russian, and Japanese.
