= Stanka Mihajlov =

Serbian politician

Stanka Mihajlov (Serbian Cyrillic: Станка Михајлов; born 11 March 1965) is a politician in Serbia. She has served in the Assembly of Vojvodina since 2016 as a member of the Serbian Progressive Party.

== Private career ==
Mihajlov lives in Ada, a predominantly Hungarian community in the North Banat District. She identifies as a worker.

== Politician ==
=== Municipal politics ===
Mihajlov entered politics as a member of the far-right Serbian Radical Party. She ran as a party candidate for Ada's twenty-fifth division in the 2000 Serbian local elections, although it is not clear from online sources if she was elected. Serbia subsequently adopted a system of proportional representation for municipal elections; Mihajlov appeared on the Radical Party's electoral list for Ada in the 2004 local elections and served in the local assembly during the term that followed. (From 2000 to 2011, mandates in Serbian elections were awarded to successful parties and coalitions rather than individual candidates, and it was common practice for the mandates to be awarded out of numerical order. Mihajlov's specific list position had no formal bearing on her chances of election.)

She appeared in the lead position on the Radical Party's list for the 2008 local elections in Ada and received a mandate for another term when the list won two out of twenty-nine seats. The Radicals experienced a serious split later in 2008, with several members joining the more moderate Serbian Progressive Party under the leadership of Tomislav Nikolić and Aleksandar Vučić. Mihajlov sided with the Progressives.

In 2011, she sought to overturn a municipal decision to raise a statue of János Damjanich, a nineteenth-century military figure considered a national hero in Hungary but often regarded by Serbs as a national traitor.

Serbia's electoral system was reformed in 2011, such that mandates were awarded in numerical order to candidates on successful lists. Mihajlov led the Progressive Party's list for Ada in the 2012 local elections and was re-elected when the list won two seats. She was chosen as president of the community council of Mol, a town within Ada, in 2013, although she was removed from this position the following year.

She appeared in the 204th position out of 250 on the Progressive Party's list for the 2014 Serbian parliamentary election. This was too low a position for election to be a realistic prospect, and indeed she was not elected even as the list won a majority victory with 158 mandates.

=== Provincial politics ===
Mihlajov received the thirty-sixth position on the Radical Party's list in the 2008 Vojvodina provincial election. The list won twenty seats, and she was not selected for a mandate. She later received the nineteenth position on the Progressive Party's list for the 2012 provincial election and was not elected when the list won fourteen seats.

She was again given the nineteenth position on the Progressive list for the 2016 provincial election and was this time elected when the list won a majority victory with sixty-three out of 120 mandates. For the next four years, she served with the government's majority in the assembly.

While she appeared in a lower position (i.e., thirty-ninth) on the Progressive list in the 2020 provincial election, Mihajlov was re-elected when the list won an increased majority with seventy-six mandates. She is now a member of the assembly committee on urban and spatial planning and environmental protection and the committee on health, social policy, labour, demographic policy, and social child care.
