= Mihailo Kravcev =

Serbian painter and author from Belgrade (born 1962)

Miša Mihajlo Kravcev
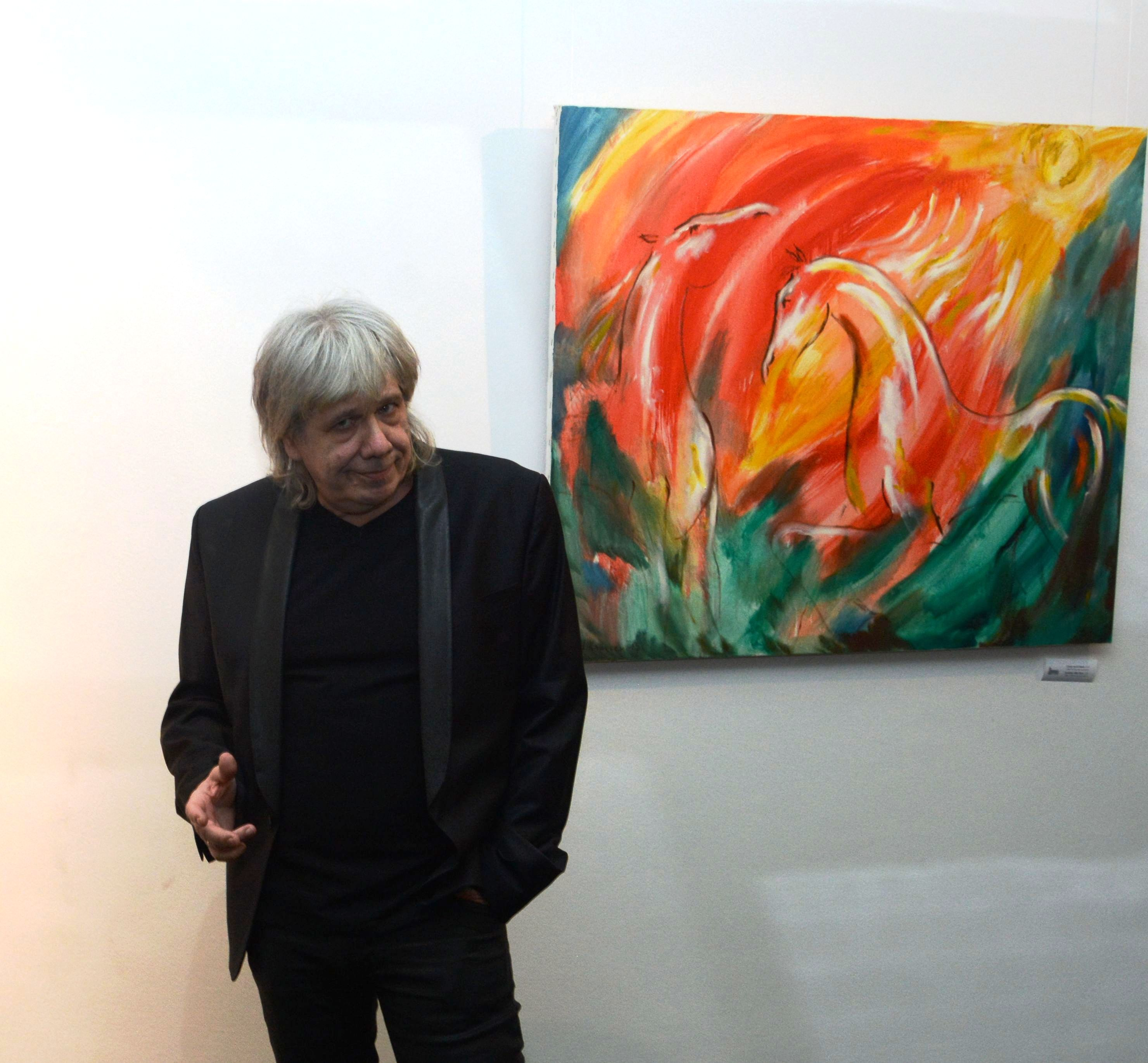
- Born: 16 February 1962 (age 63); Belgrade, Yugoslavia
- Occupation(s): Artist, author

Miša Mihajlo Kravcev (Serbian: Миша Михајло Кравцев; born 16 February 1962) is a Serbian painter and author from Belgrade.

== Work ==
Kravcev has had a number of joint and author's exhibitions in Serbia and abroad, including in the Cultural Center of Belgrade and gallery Đura Jakšić, Skadarlija, and the Grand Gallery of the Central Military Club. He participated with an exhibit in Stockholm 1998 within the "Capital of European Culture" festival.

As a writer, Kravcev has published three titles, The Angel of Coincidence, Saga of the Red Star, and A Lions's Spring.

== Gallery ==
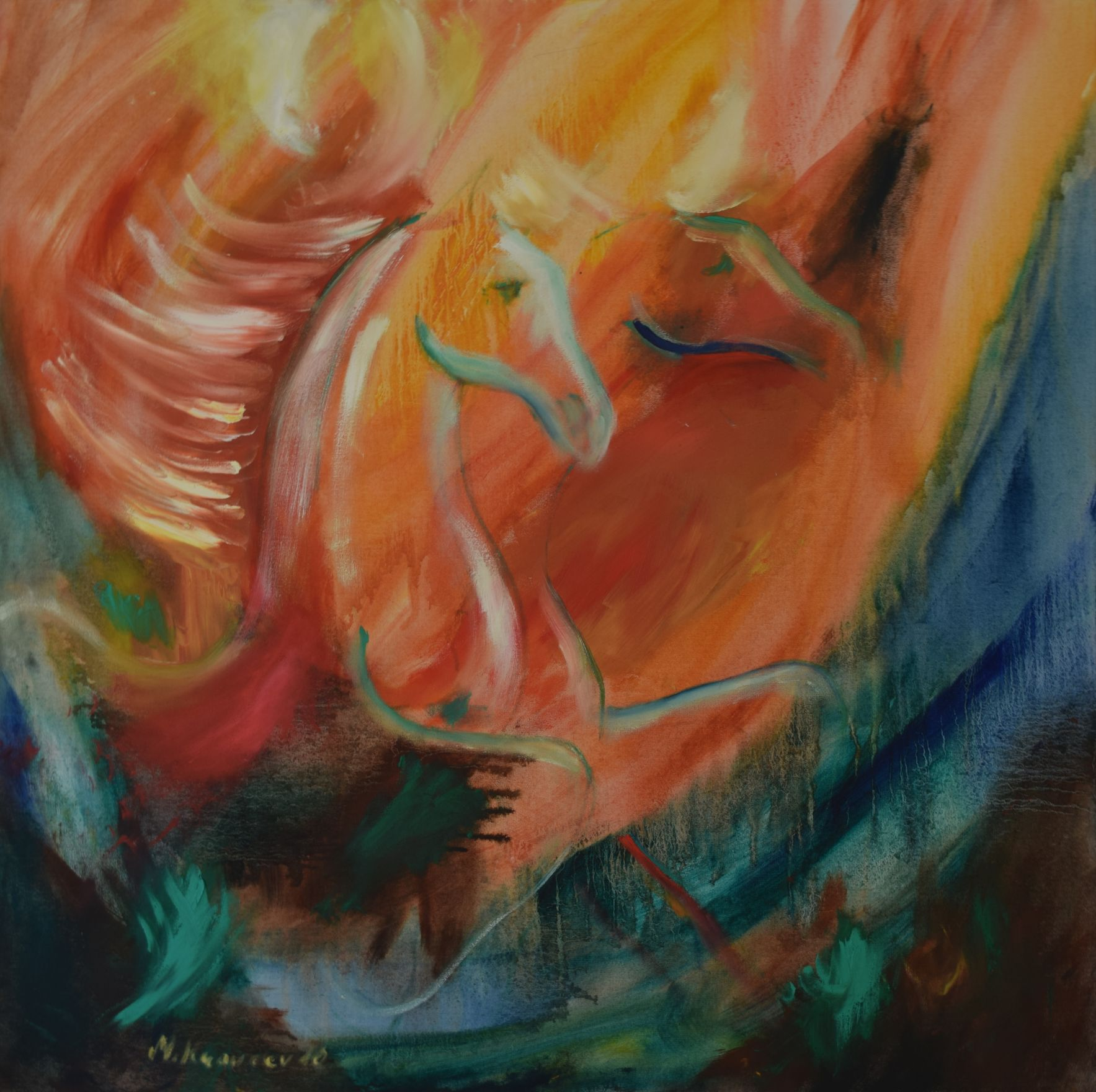
Red Winners, 2010, oil on canvas 100x100

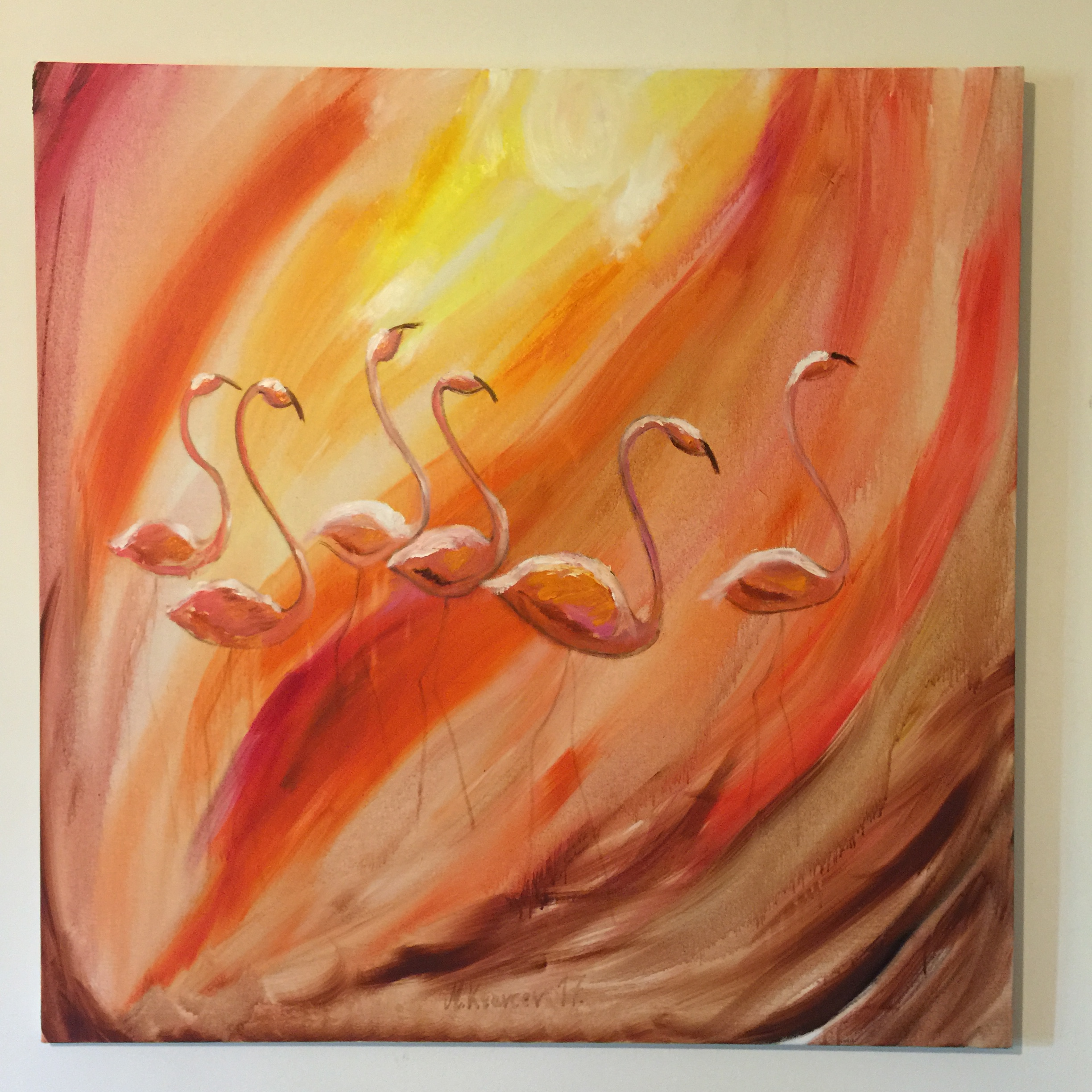
Flamingoes at Dawn, 2017, Oil on canvas 100x100

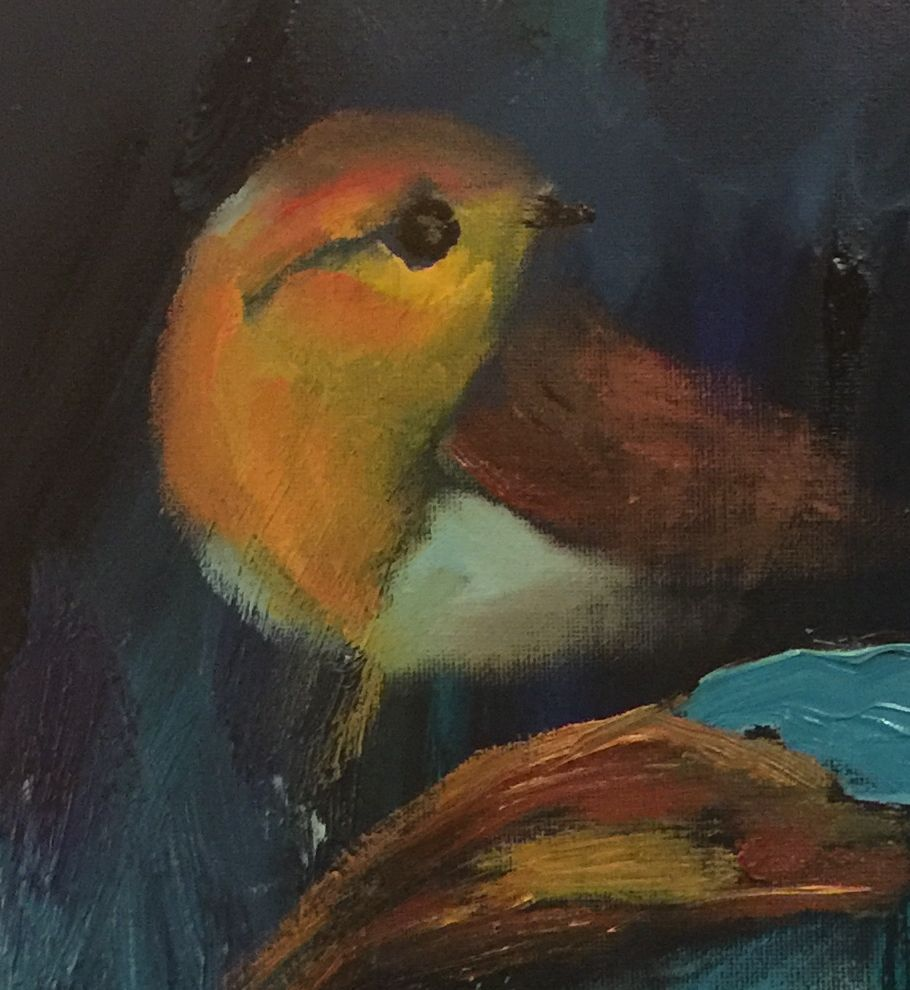
Sparrow

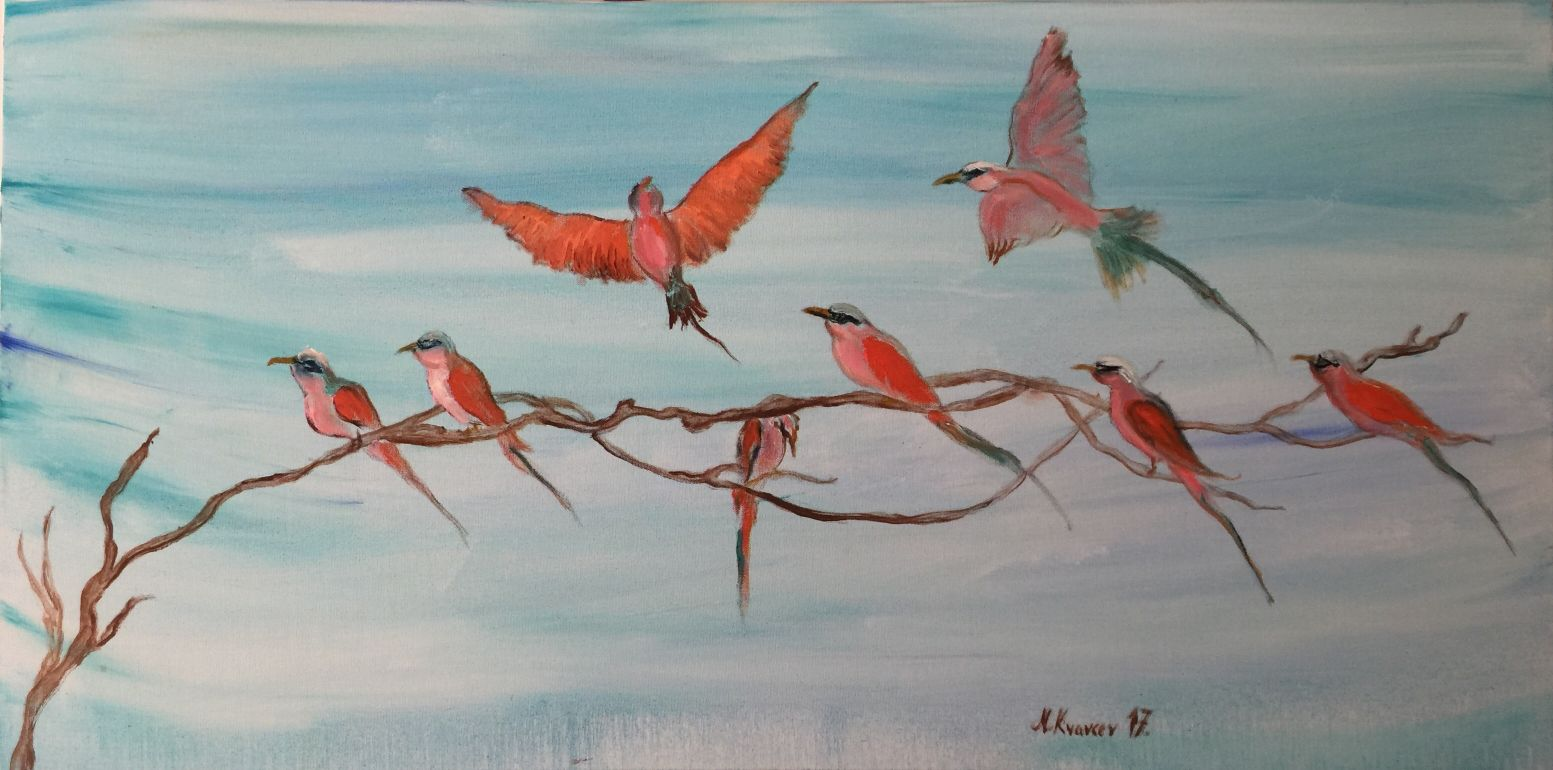
Early Morning Sonata, 2017, oil on canvas 60x120

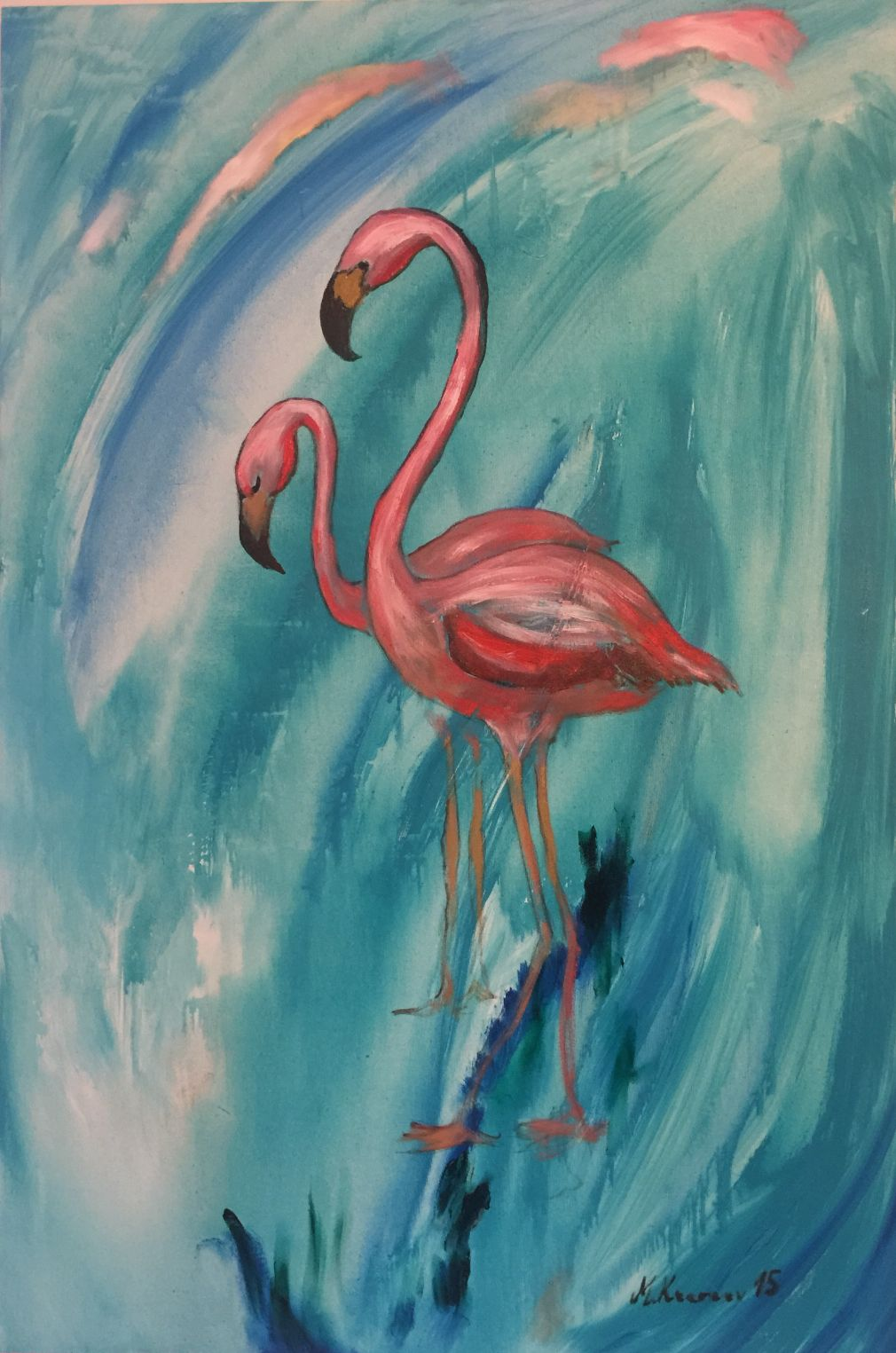
Pair of Flamingoes in Turquoise, 2015, oil on canvas 120x80

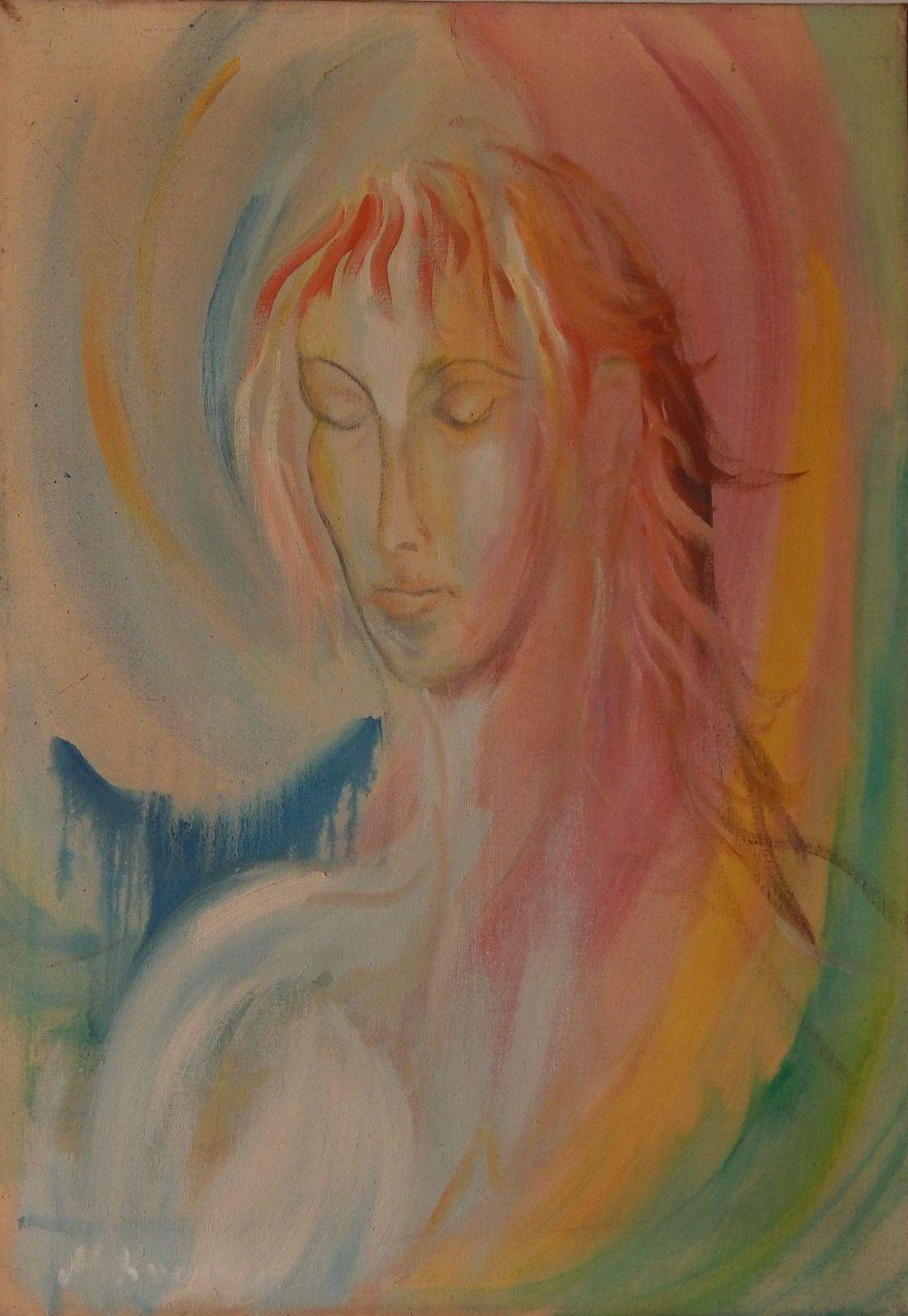
Red Orpheus, 1995, oil on canvas 70x50

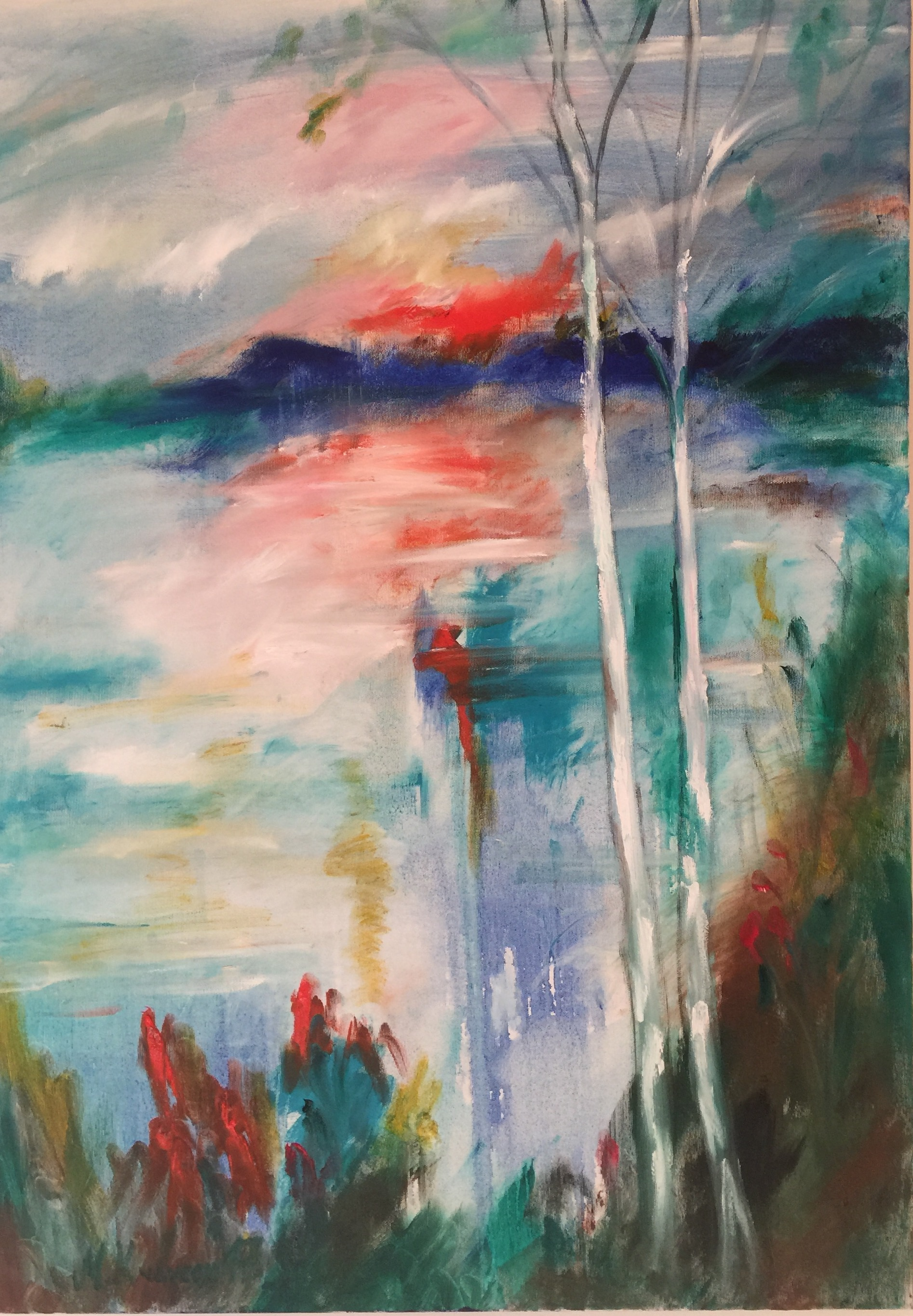
Glare of the Landscape on the Birches – or – The Water Fairies are Coming Out, 2017, oil on canvas 100x70

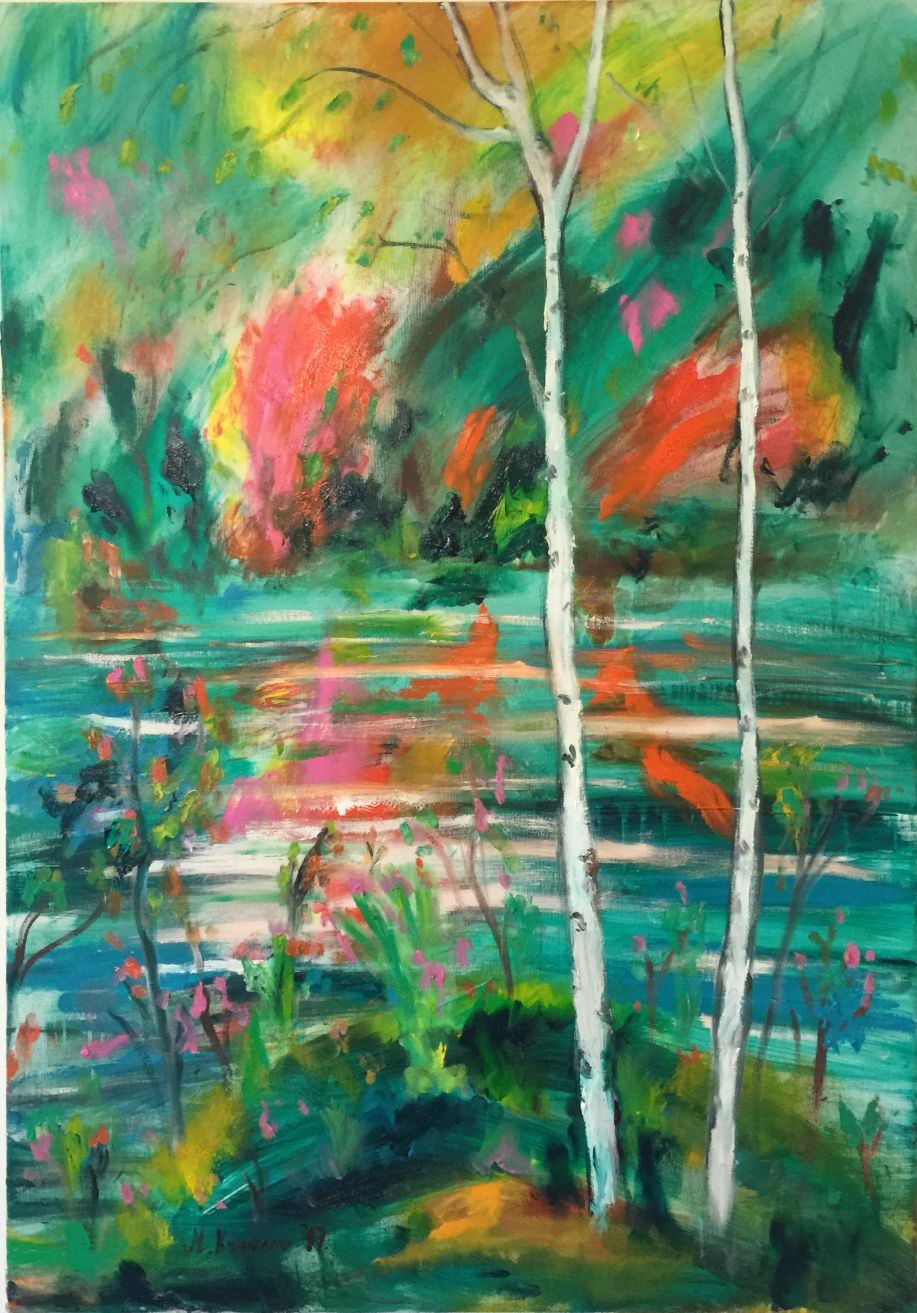
Russian Fairy Tail, Just Before It'll Jump Out From the Scenery and Begin, 2017, oil on canvas 100x70

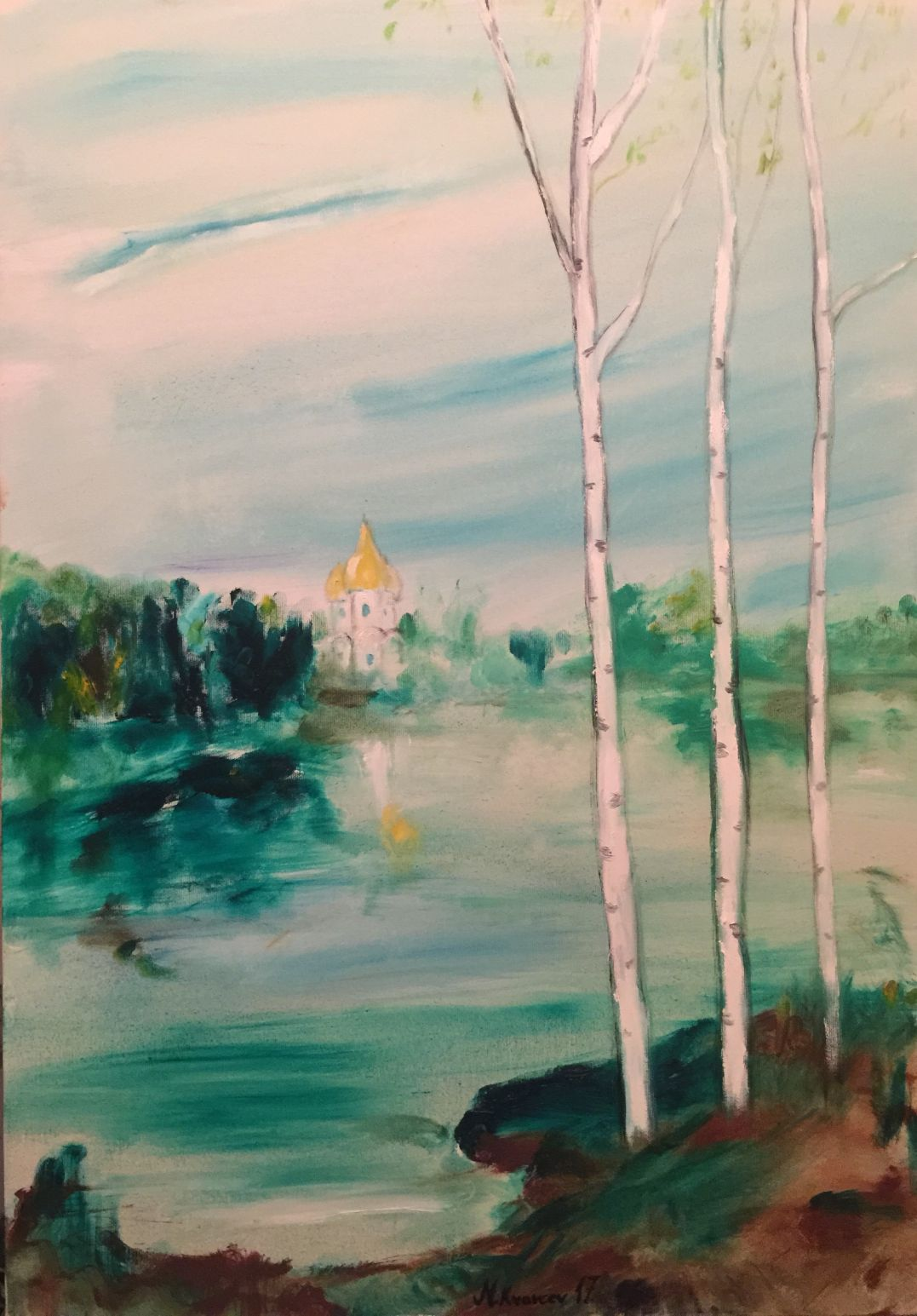
Somewhere in Russia, 2017, oil on canvas 100x70
