= Đura Jakšić =

Serbian poet, writer, and painter (1832–1878)

Georgije Đura Jakšić Георгије Ђура Јакшић
- Born: Georgije Jakšić; 27 July 1832; Srpska Crnja, Austrian Empire (modern-day Serbia)
- Died: 16 November 1878 (aged 46); Belgrade, Principality of Serbia (modern-day Serbia)
- Resting place: Belgrade
- Education: University of Vienna
- Occupations: poet, painter, dramatist, writer
- Writing career
- Language: Serbian
- Period: 1853–1878
- Genre: romanticism

Georgije "Đura" Jakšić (Serbian: Георгије Ђура Јакшић; 27 July 1832 – 16 November 1878) was a Serbian poet, painter, writer, dramatist and bohemian.

== Biography ==
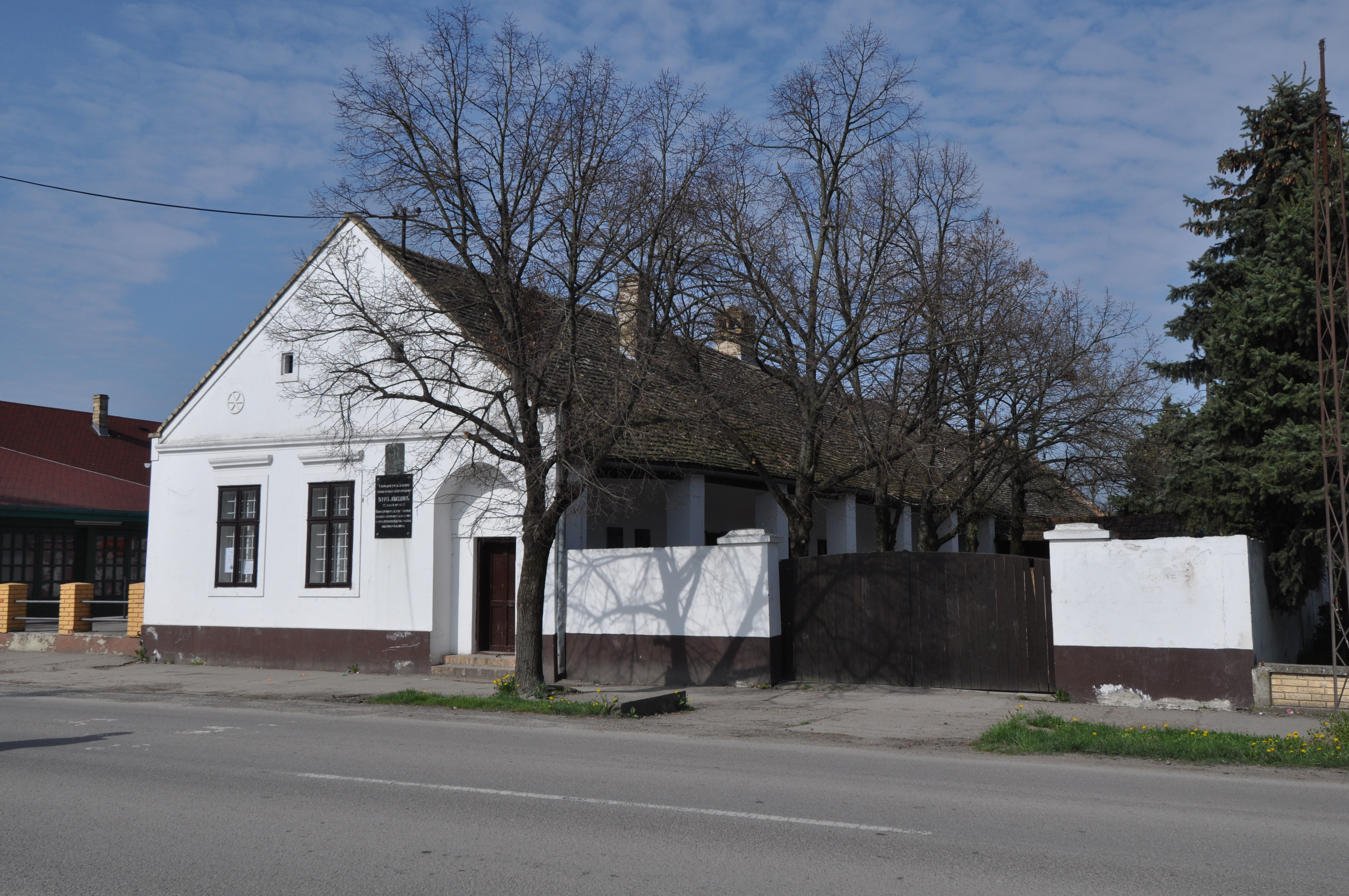
Jakšić's birth house in Srpska Crnja

Đura Jakšić was born as Georgije Jakšić in Srpska Crnja, Austrian Empire (present-day Serbia). His father was a Serbian Orthodox priest. Georgije's early education took place in Timișoara and Szeged. He lived for a time in Zrenjanin, where he began studying painting under Konstantin Danil. He later studied fine arts in Vienna and Munich but the revolution of 1848 interrupted his education, which he never finished. He took active part in the 1848 Revolution and was wounded while fighting in Srbobran. After the revolution he moved to Belgrade, Principality of Serbia, where he served as a schoolteacher, a proofreader in a state-owned printing office, and in various other jobs, although he was often unemployed. As a political liberal, he was persecuted by authorities. Jakšić died in 1878, having had taken part in the uprising against the Turks in Bosnia and Herzegovina.

Jakšić is one of the most expressive representatives of Serbian Romanticism. According to Serbian literary critic Jovan Skerlić, Jakšiċ was influenced mainly by Sándor Petőfi, the great Hungarian poet of the 1848 Revolution, and Lord Byron's poetry depicting the Greek War of Independence.

== Literary works ==
Đura Jakšić wrote about forty short stories and three full-length dramas in verse on historical themes:

- Stanoje Glavaš (1878)
- The Migration of the Serbs (Seoba Srbalja, 1864)
- Elizabeth the Montenegrin Queen (Jelisaveta kneginja crnogorska, 1868) and the novel Warriors.

He also wrote poems, several of which are considered among the best of 19th-century Serbian poetry: Na Liparu (On the Lipar Hill), Put u Gornjak (The Road to Gornjak) and Mila, which is dedicated to his first love Mila, who he intended to marry but never found courage to tell her. He also drew sketches of Mila, one of which later became his famous painting "Devojka u Plavom" (The Girl in Blue). Other notable poems are Otadžbina (Fatherland), Veče (Evening) and Ponoć (Midnight). Jakšić published Pripovetke (Short Stories), which was released posthumously in two volumes on two occasions, 1882–1883 and 1902 in Belgrade. Through them he expressed his pessimism and bitterness about the harsh blows life and people had dealt him. A popular motif in Jakšić's work is the Battle of Kosovo, Kosovo myth, eagles and Serbian epic poetry.

== Artistic opus ==
The main influences on Jakšić were Rembrandt, Diego Velázquez and Peter Paul Rubens. Jakšić's work varies in quality, ranging from masterpieces to half-professional paintings. According to Novak Radonić, the biggest problem with his painting is the improper use of anatomy.

His most praised picture is "The Lady in Blue", which was used for promotion during the reopening of the National Museum of Serbia.

Jakšić painted around 200 paintings.

The following paintings by Đura Jakšić are part of the collection of the National Museum of Serbia in Belgrade:

- Autoprotrait
- Battle of Montenegris
- Kosovo
- Night Watch (Na straži)
- Ubistvo Karađorđa (The Assassination of Karađorđe Petrović)
- Strahinja Ban (Strahinja Banović)
- Knez Lazar Hrebeljanović (Lazar of Serbia)
- Girl in Blue (Devojka u plavom)
- Portrait of director Ćirić
- Car Dušan (Stephen Uroš IV Dušan of Serbia)
- Knjaz Milan Obrenović IV
- Nevesta Baja Pivljanina (The bride of Bajo Pivljanin)

== Legacy ==
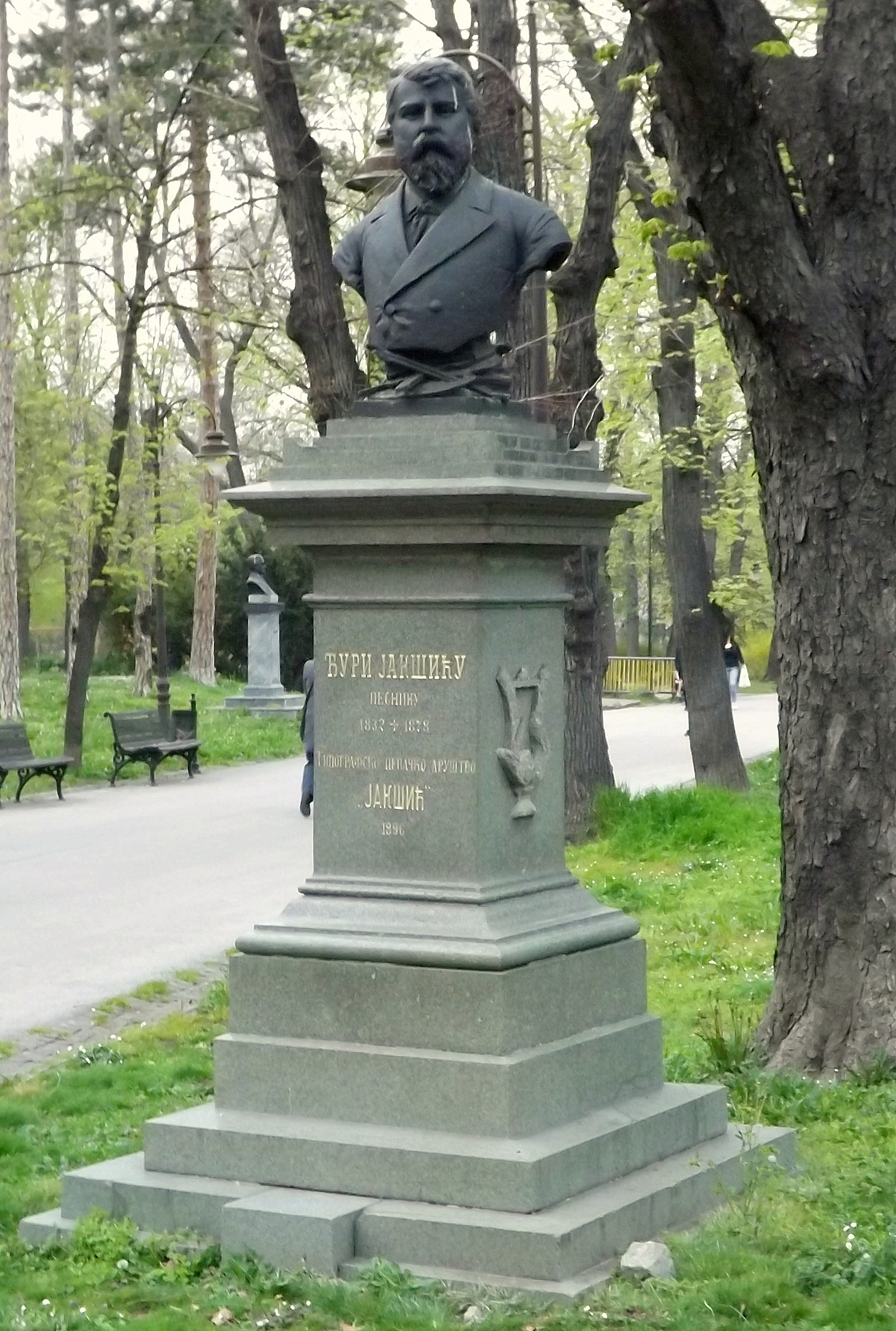
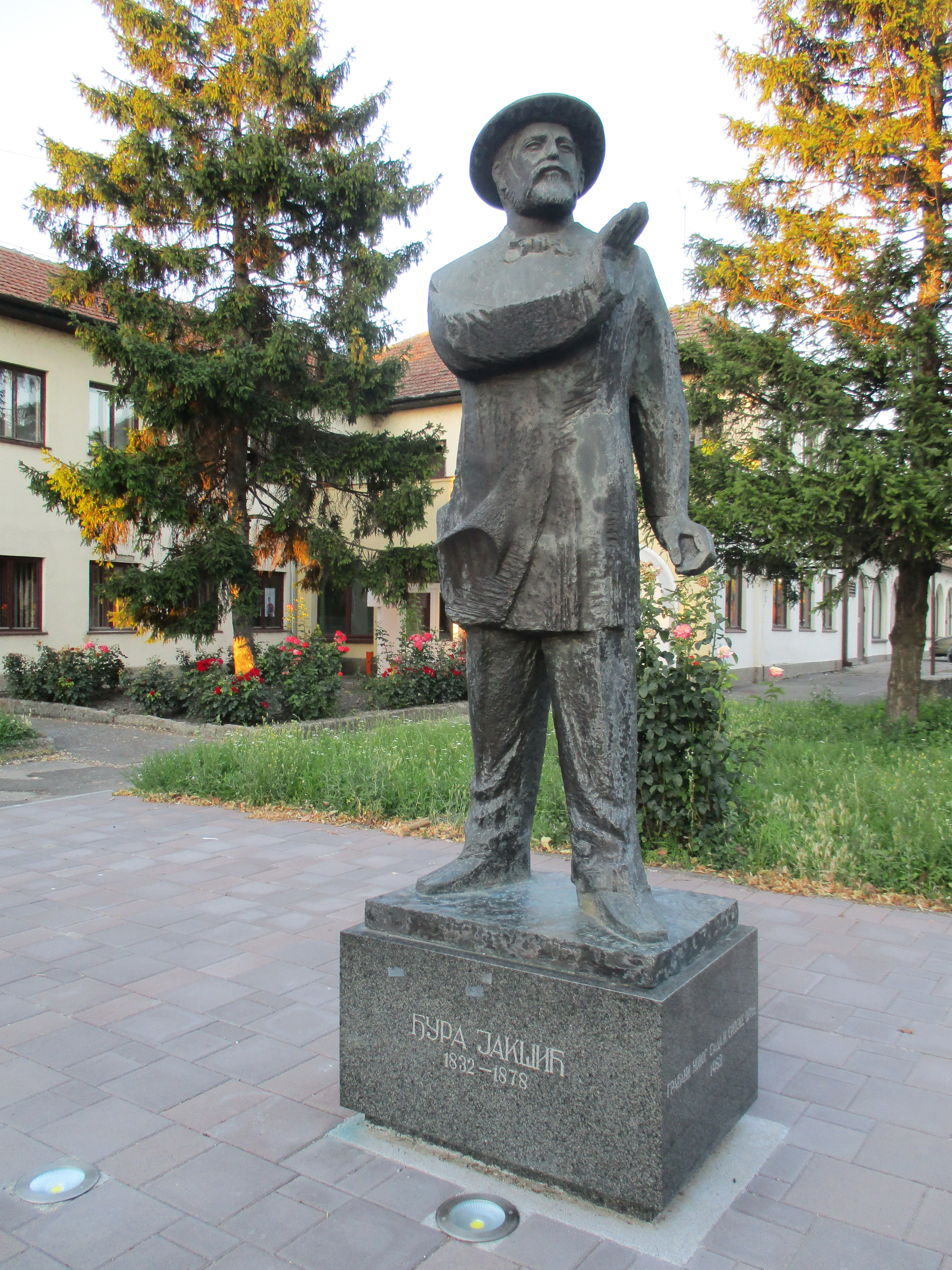
Left: Monument to Jakšić on Kalemegdan
Right: Monument in Srpska Crnja

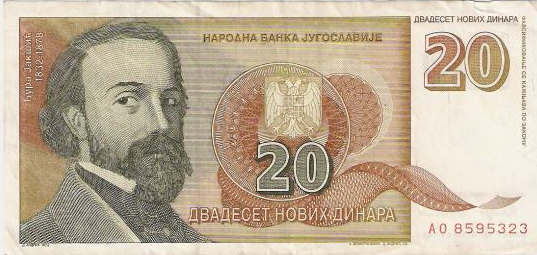
Jakšić was featured on the 20 new dinars banknote from the 1994 series

Đura Jakšić is included in The 100 most prominent Serbs. His house in Srpska Crnja is currently used as a Memorial Museum and for poetry performances.

Jakšić was one of the leaders of Serbian Romanticism and one of the country's greatest painters of that movement, together witk Novak Radonić. Although he wrote a number of loosely organized romantic plays, he is mostly known for his paintings and poetry. His poems include sonnets, lyrics, patriotic songs and full-scale epics. His favorite theme is nature and the patriotism.

The award for the best book of poetry in the Serbian language bears his name.

Jakšić was also a teacher and a professor; schools and colleges throughout Serbia bear his name.

A number of anecdotes about Jakšić was published.

== Gallery ==
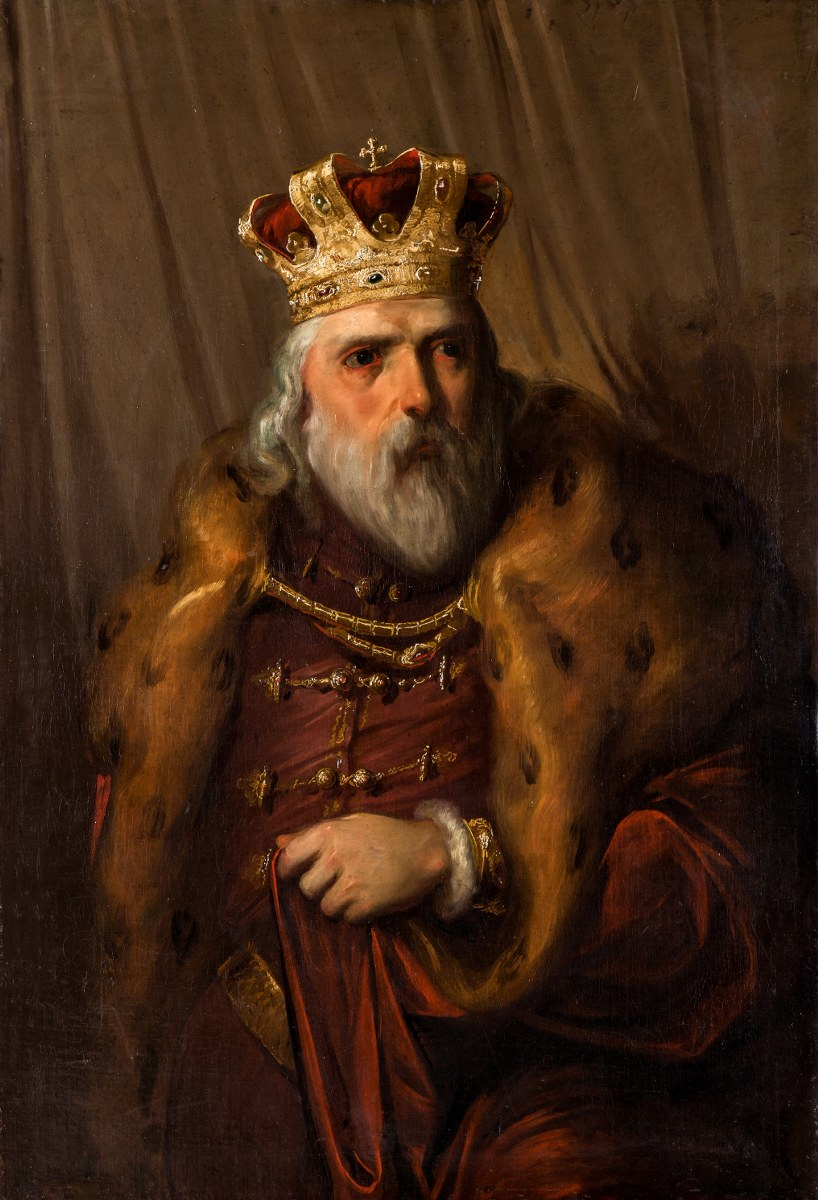
knez Lazar Hrebeljanović, 1857‒1859

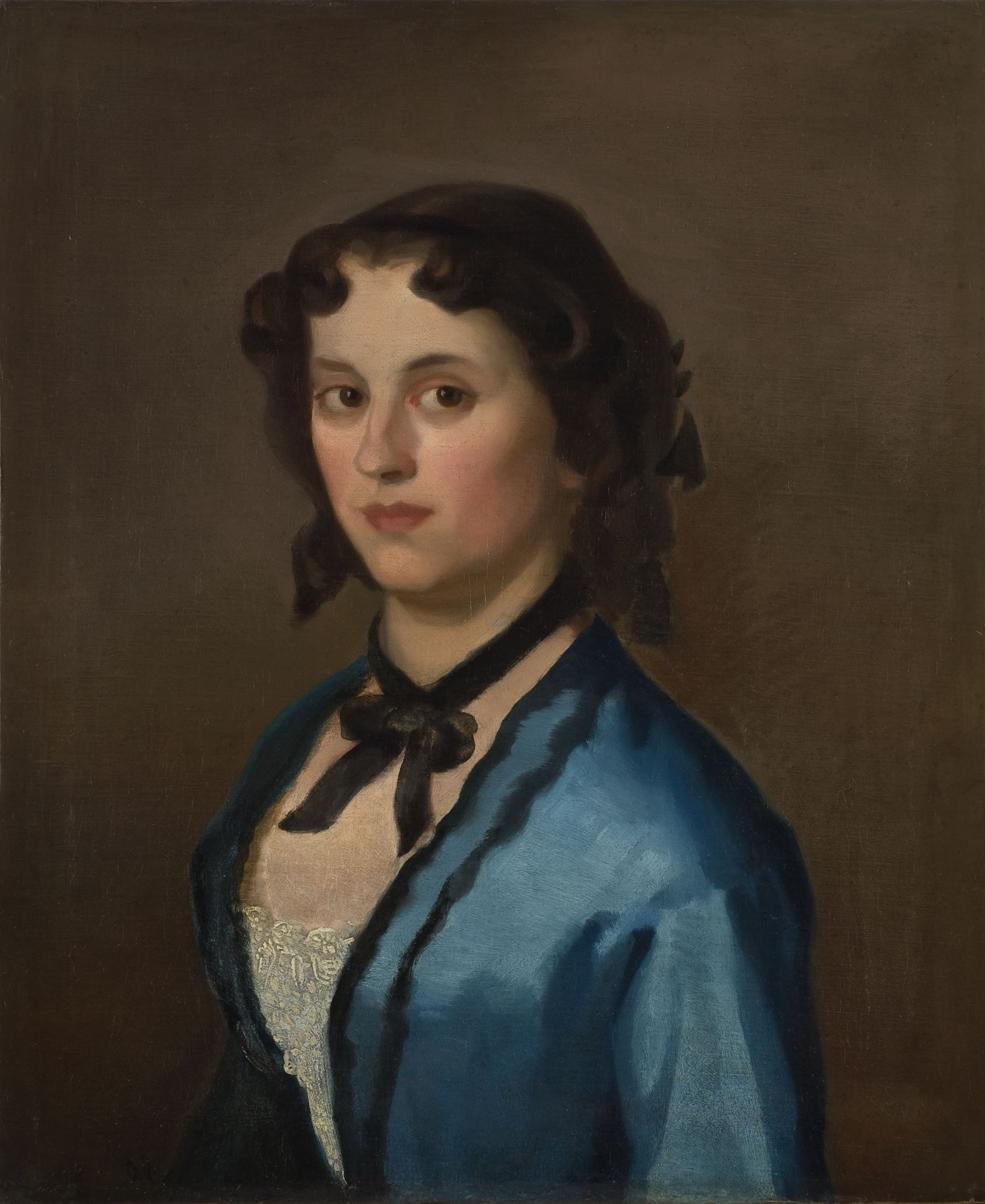
Devojka u plavom (Girl in Blue), 1856

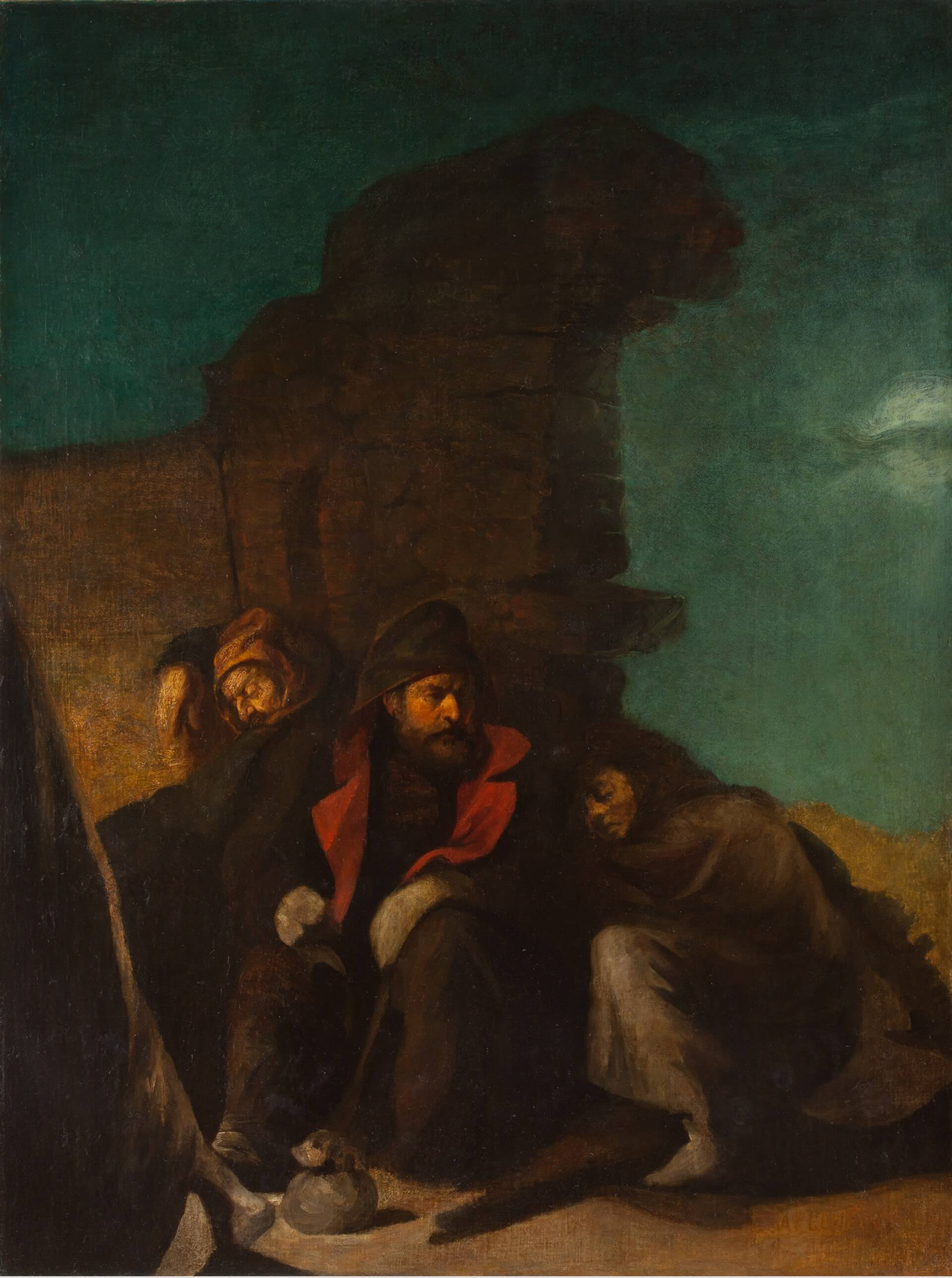
Odmor posle boja (karaula), 1876

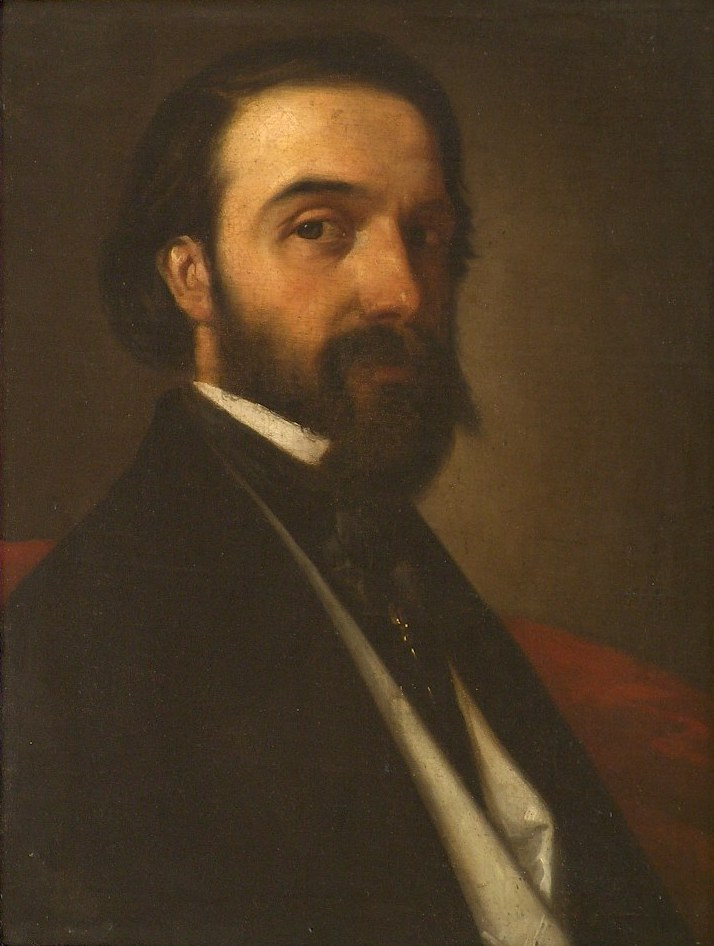
Self-portrait, 1857‒1858

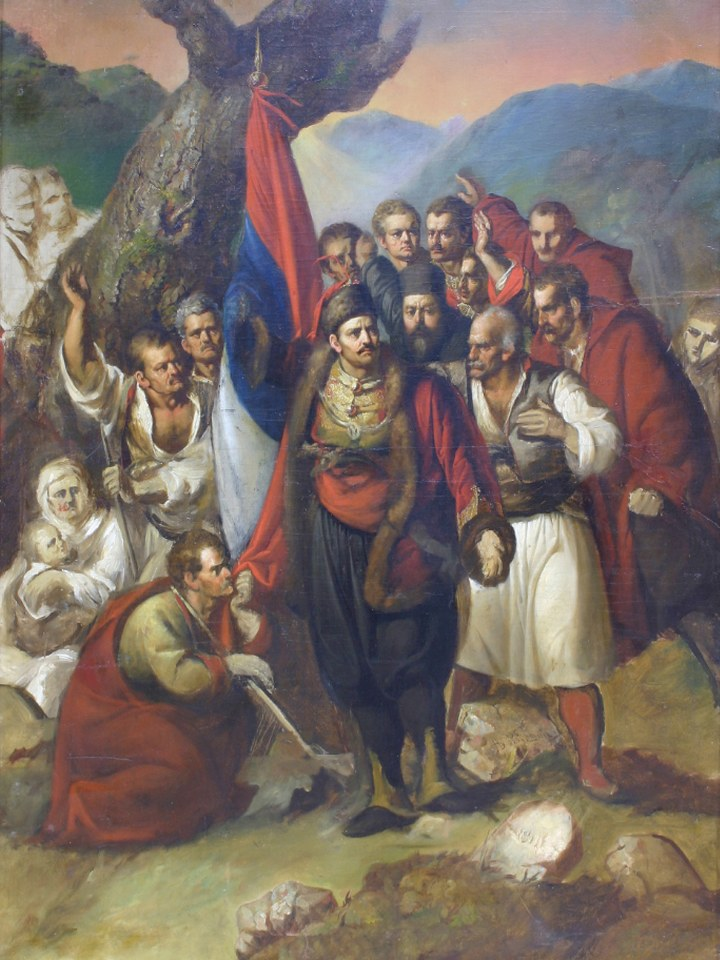
The Uprising at Takovo, 1876‒1878

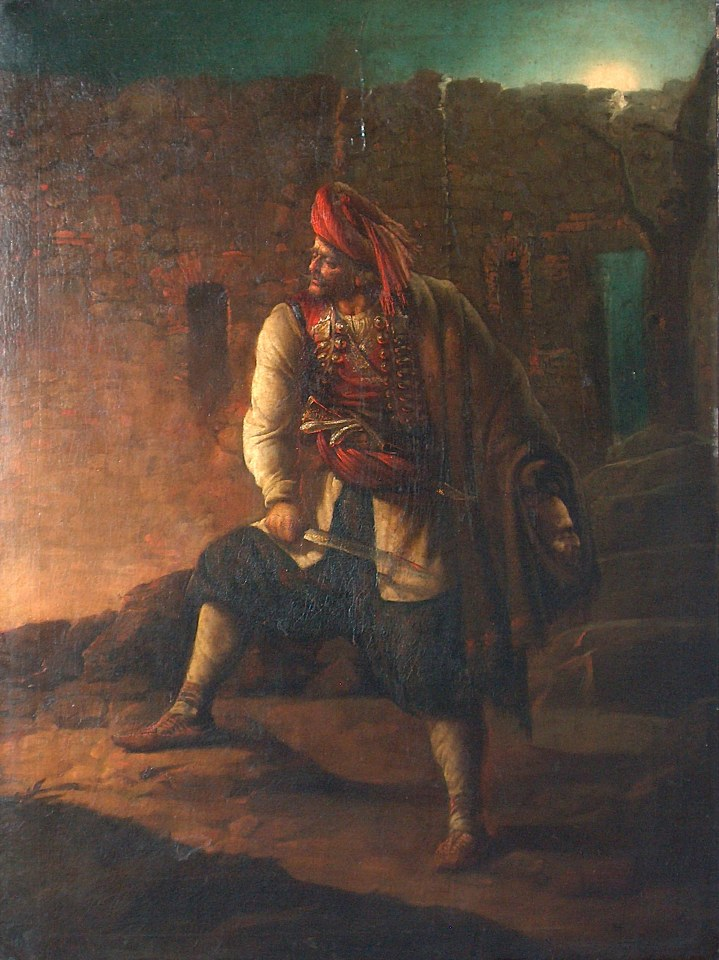
Montenegrin, 1875

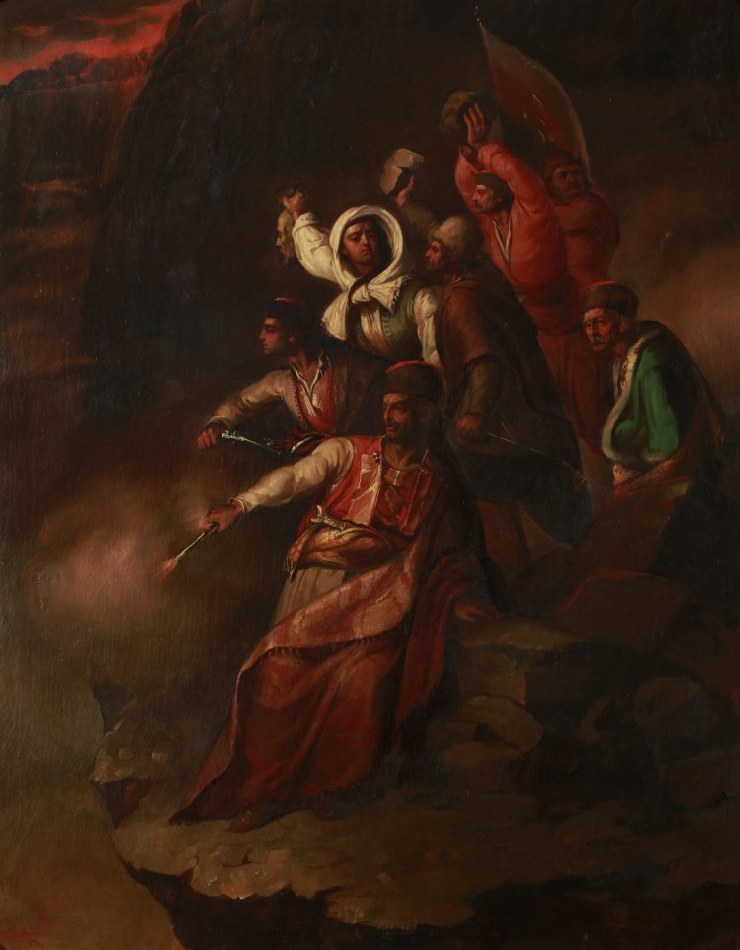
Uprising of Montenegrins, 1862

== See also ==
- Konstantin Danil
- Nikola Aleksić
- Katarina Ivanović
- Novak Radonić
- Stevan Todorović
