= Novak Radonić =

Serbian painter (1826–1890)

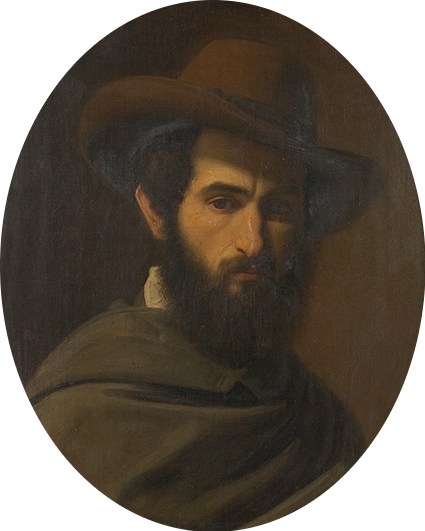
- Born: 31 March 1826; Mol, Habsburg monarchy
- Died: 11 July 1890 (aged 64); Sremska Kamenica, Habsburg monarchy
- Occupation: painter

Novak Radonić (Serbian Cyrillic: Новак Радонић; 31 March 1826 – 11 July 1890) was a Serbian painter from the Austrian Empire and later Austria-Hungary.

== Life and work ==
He was the pupil of Petar Pilić and Nikola Aleksić before he went to study art in Vienna in 1851. Upon graduation, he went to live and work in Bačka. He completed iconostases in churches in his native Mol, as well as in nearby Ada and Srbobran.

He was best known as a painter of historical compositions, for example the Death of Emperor Uroš and the Death of Prince Marko. In addition to religious themes and historical compositions, he also painted portraits in which he reached the highest peaks. His portrait of a boy Dušan Popović is one of the most beautiful and celebrated Serbian portraits from the nineteenth century. As a visual chronicler of Serbian civil society, with an exceptional feeling for the characteristics of the character, he left a whole gallery of portraits of friends and distinguished contemporaries. A special unit of his consists of self-portraits in which he gives a romantic analysis of the subject's own character and mental condition. The encounter with the works of the greats of Italian Renaissance painting conceived doubts in his own artistic possibilities which led him to the final abandonment of painting. Radonić, Pavle Simić, and Đura Jakšić were the culmination of Serbian Romanticism.

== Gallery ==
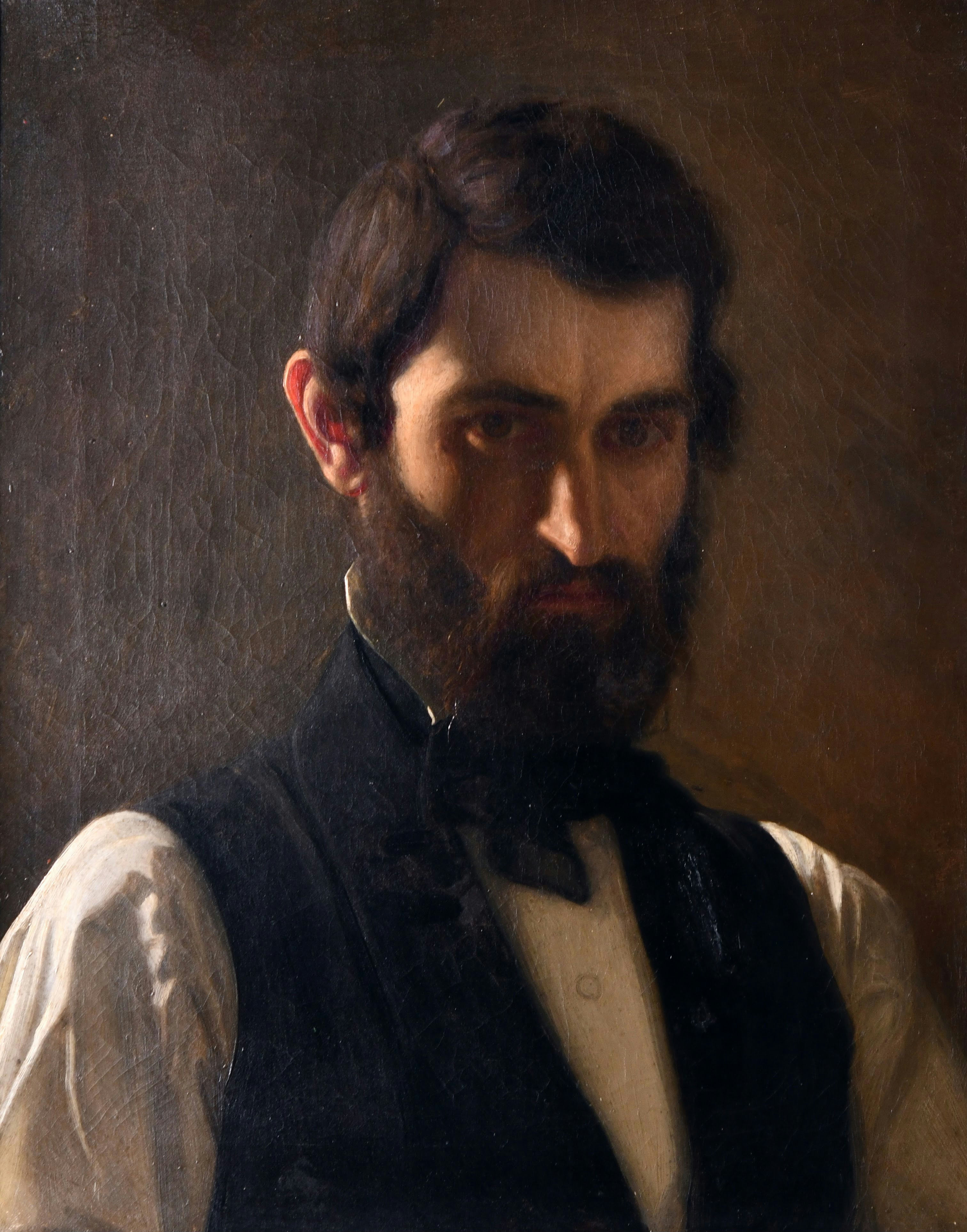
Self-portrait (1857)

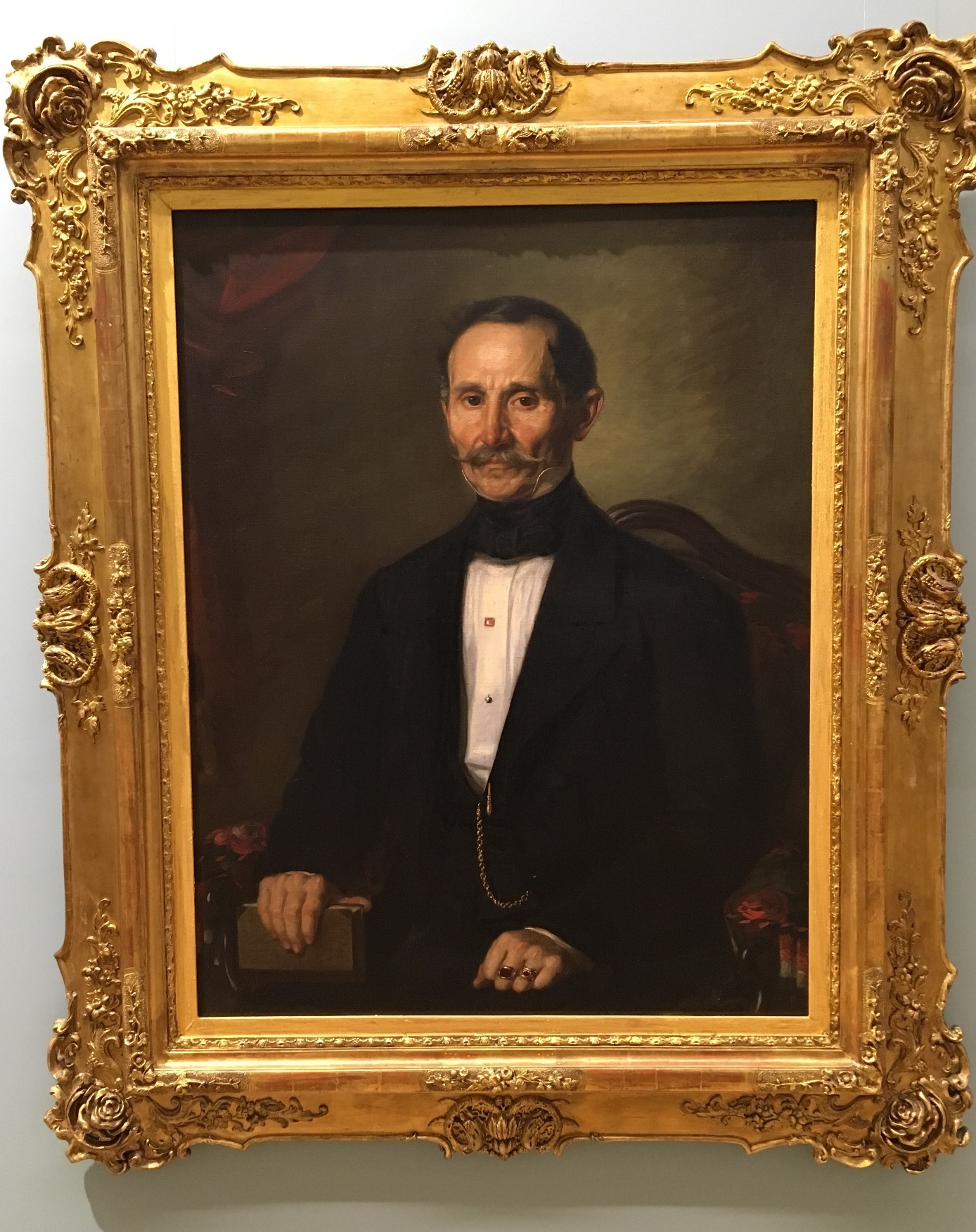
Portrait of Dimitrije Saračević (1857)

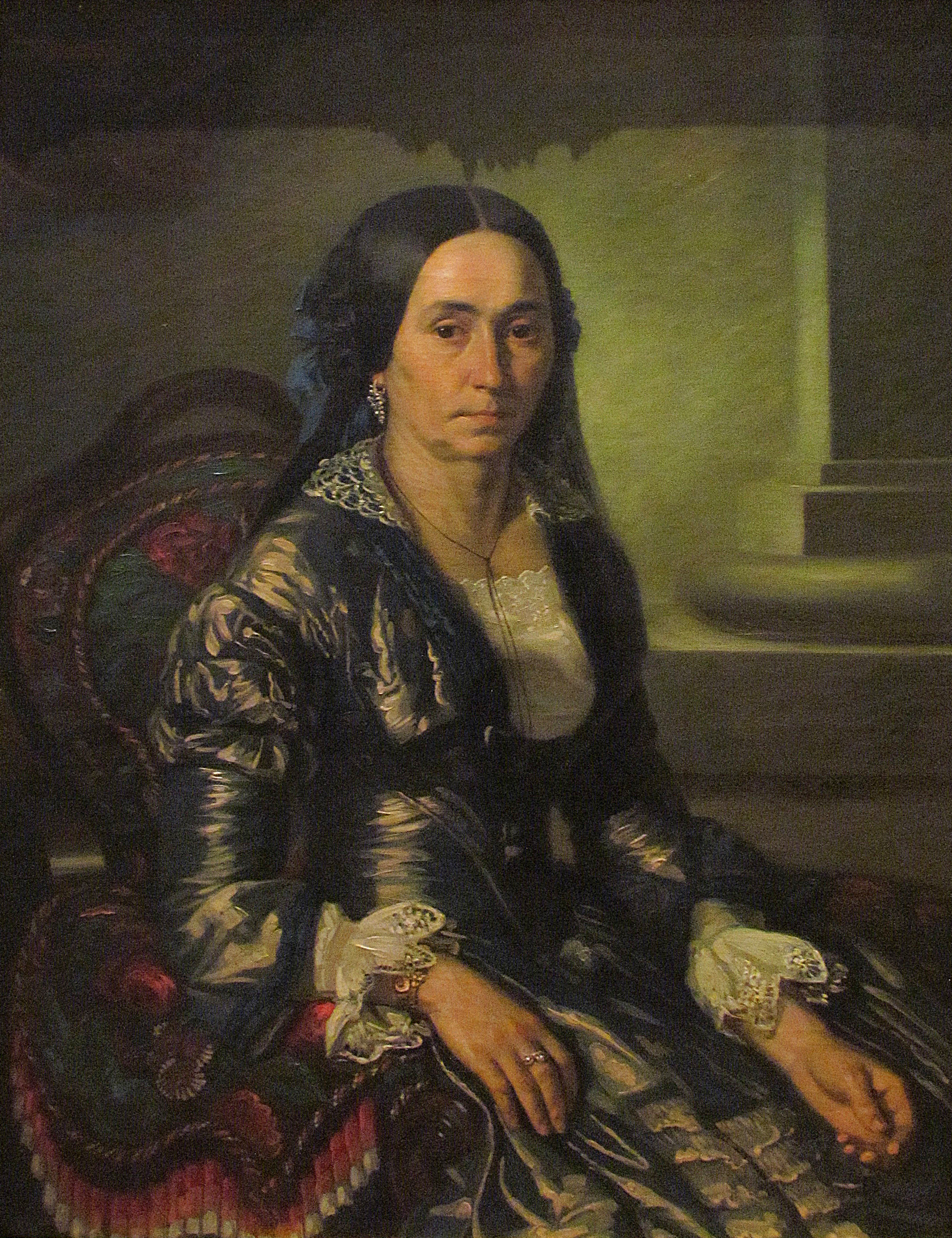
Portrait of Persida Saračević (1857)

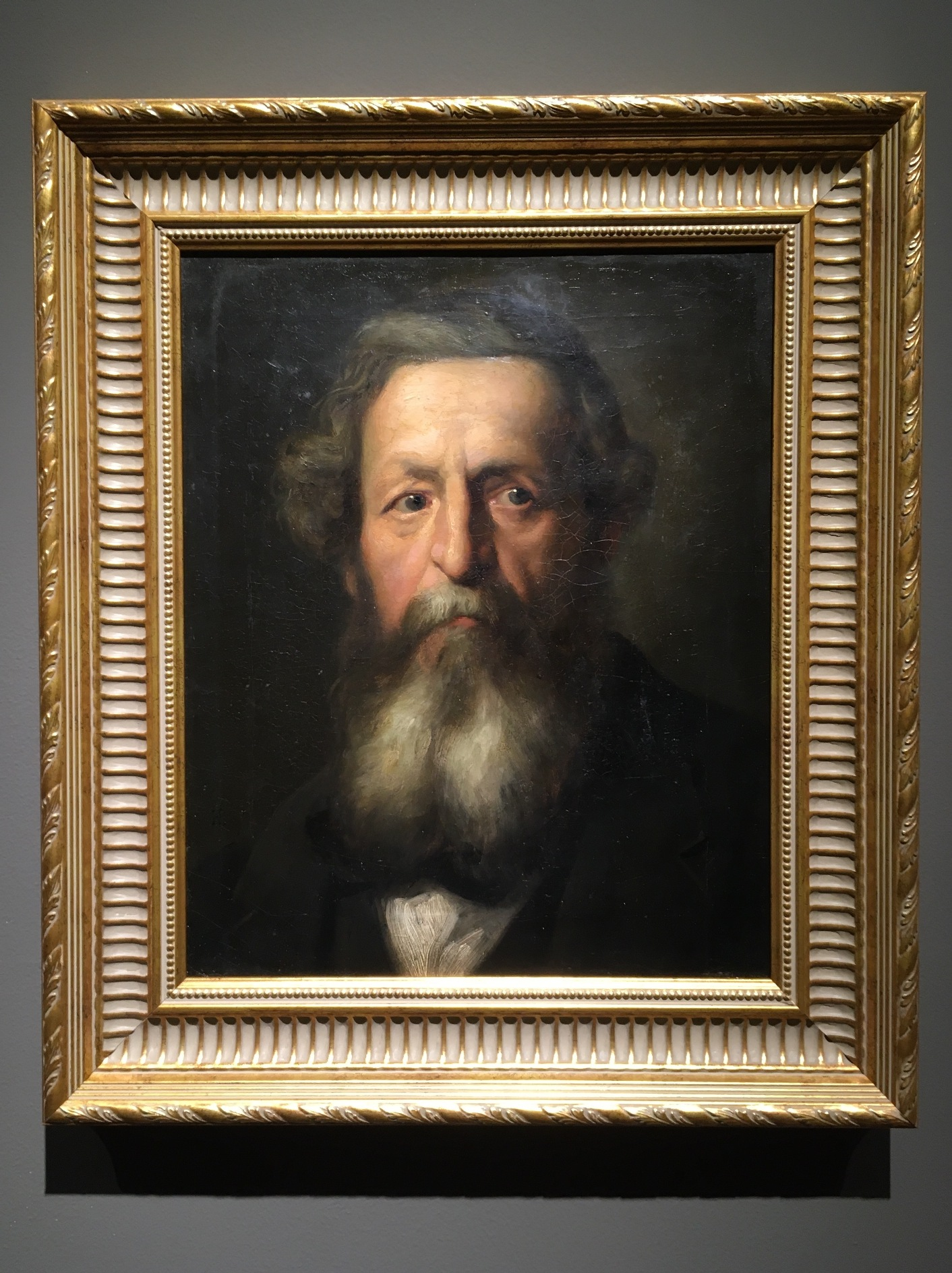
Studija muškarca sa bradom (1858-1859)

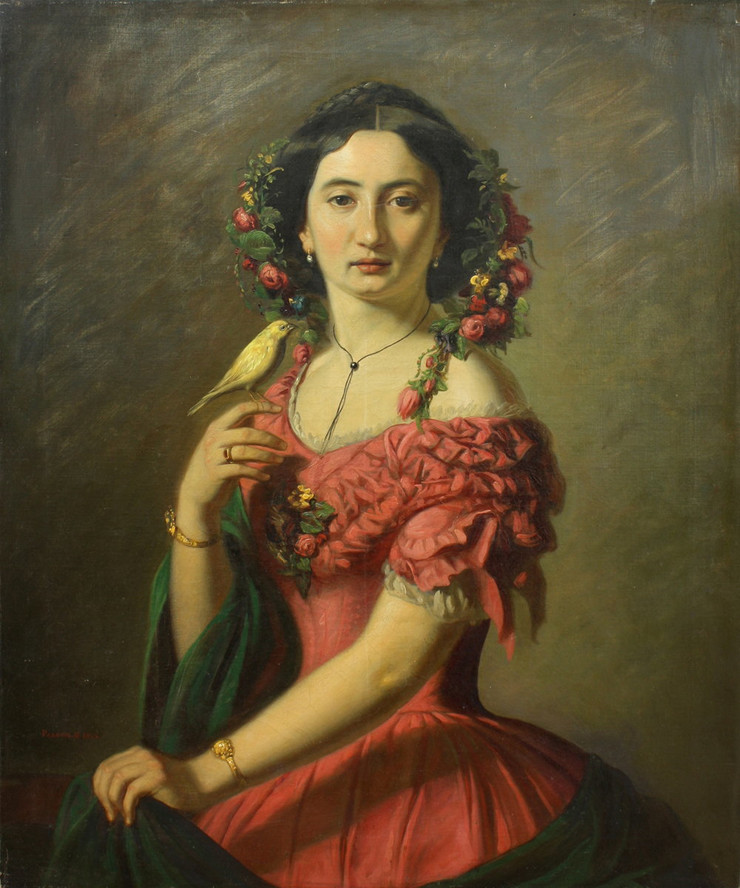
Girl with a canary (1865)

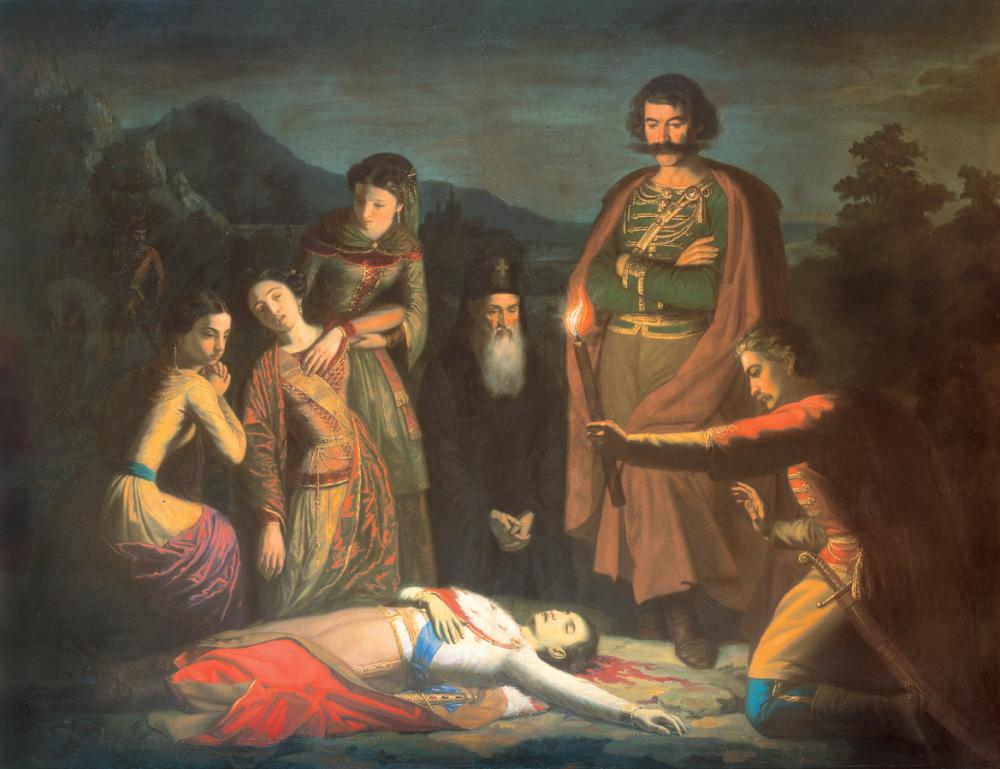
The death of Emperor Stefan Uroš V (1890)

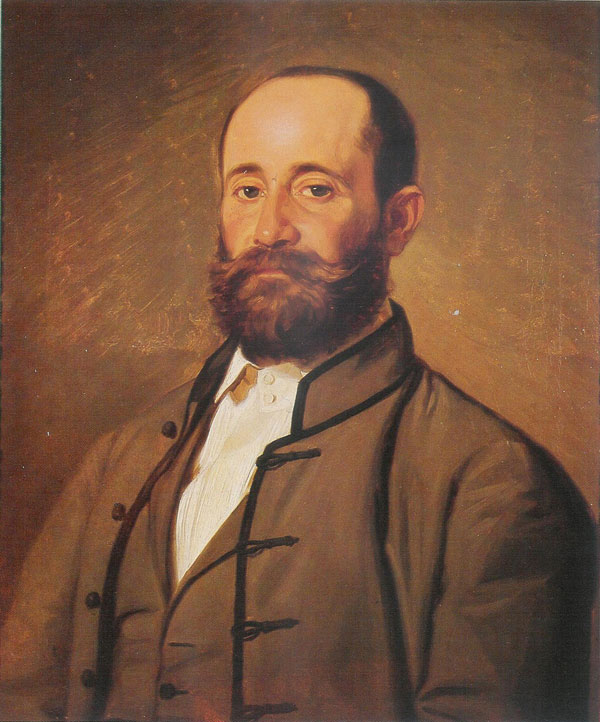
Portrait of Jakov Ignjatović

== See also ==
- List of painters from Serbia
- Konstantin Danil
- Nikola Aleksić
- Đura Jakšić
- Katarina Ivanović
- Stevan Todorović
