= Jovan Radonić =

Serbian historian

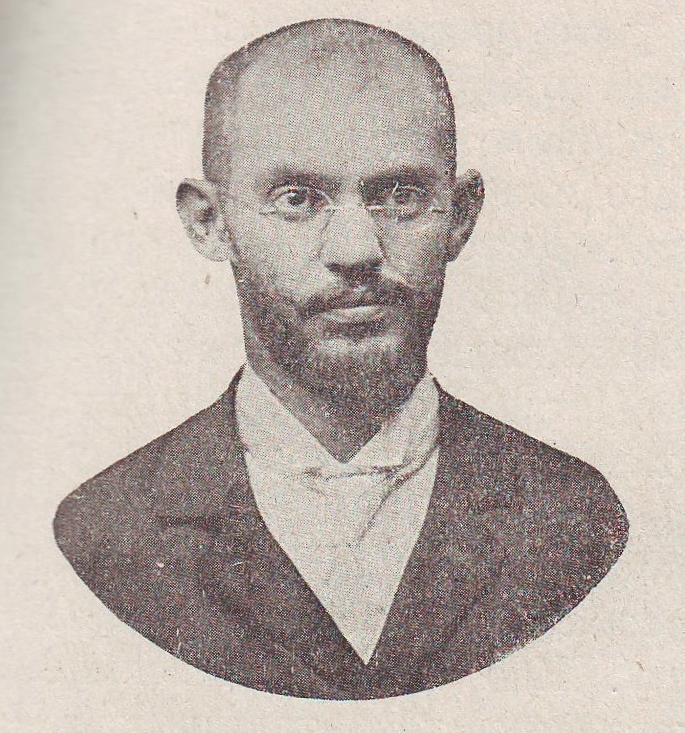
- Portrait photograph of Radonić as a youth
- Born: Јован Радонић; 9 February 1873; Mol, Austria-Hungary
- Died: 25 November 1956 (aged 83); Yugoslavia
- Occupations: Historian, librarian

Jovan Radonić (9 February 1873, Mol, Austria-Hungary — 25 November 1956, Yugoslavia) was a Serbian historian, librarian of Matica Srpska library and member of the Serbian Academy of Sciences and Arts.

== Biography ==
Radonić graduated from the University of Vienna, where he studied under the tutelage of Konstantin Jireček and Vatroslav Jagić, and attended seminars given by Karl Krumbacher in Munich. In 1905, he taught at the University of Belgrade. In 1948 he joined the staff of the Institute of History of the Serbian Academy of Sciences. Radonić, a Slavist and Byzantinist, devoted his research to Balkan medieval history. He translated into Serbian and expanded Jireček's History of the Serbs (vols. 1–4, Belgrade, 1922–25; 2nd ed., Belgrade, 1952).

He dedicated his first book to Ilarion Ruvarac who established critical approach of Serbian historiography. In his work Đurađ Kastriot Skenderbeg i Arbanija u XV veku he had collected major documentary and literary sources about Skanderbeg.

== Selected works ==
- Zapadna Evropa i balkanski narodi prema Turcima u prvoj polovini XV veka (in Serbian), Novi Sad: Matica Srpska, 1905, OCLC 13160612
- Ilarijon Ruvarac i njegovi radovi na polju crkvene istorije (in Serbian), 1906, OCLC 40630293
- Grof Đorđe Branković, izabrani despot srpski u Budimu (in Serbian), Novi Sad: Matica srpska, 1911, OCLC 25321205
- Grof Đorđe Branković i njegovo vreme (in Serbian), Belgrade: Srpska kraljevska akademija, 1911, OCLC 697776534
- Đorđe Branković despot "Ilirika" (in Serbian), Belgrade: Štamparija i cinkografija "Vreme", 1929, OCLC 23565443
- Kritovul: vizantijski istorik XV veka (in Serbian), Belgrade: Srpska Manastirska štamparija u Sremskim Karlovcima, 1930, OCLC 41427652
- Dubrovačka akta i povelje (in Serbo-Croatian), Belgrade: Srpska kraljevska akademija; Srpska akademija nauka, 1934–1951
- Đurađ Kastriot Skenderbeg i Arbanija u XV veku (in Serbian), Belgrade: Srpska Kraljevska Akademija, 1942, OCLC 11859269
- (In Serbian) Rimska kurija i južnoslovenske zemlje of XVI do XIX veka (Roman Curia and South-Slavic lands from the sixteenth to the nineteenth centuries), Belgrade, Srpska akademija nauka, 1950
- (in Serbian) Ogledalo sveta ili Istroija Mehmeda Nešrije (The Mirror of the World or the History of Mehmed Neşri), Belgrade, Naučna knjiga, 1957
