= Kiril Živković =

Serbian bishop of Bulgarian descent

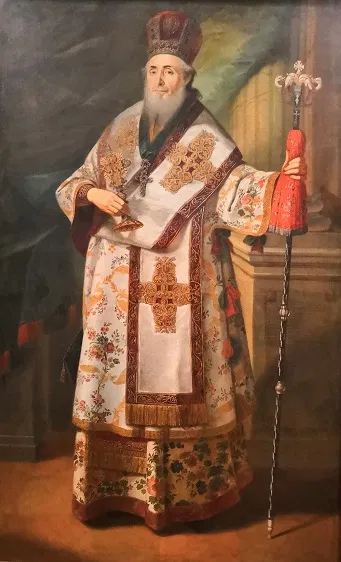
- Portrait of Kiril Živković by Arsenije Teodorović, 1799
- Born: 1730; Pirot, Ottoman Empire (now Serbia)
- Died: 1807 (aged 77); Pakrac, Habsburg Empire (now Croatia)
- Occupations: monk, bishop, writer
- Notable work: The Lives of Serbian Saints and Enlighteners Simeon and Sava; Manuscript from Temska Monastery
- Title: Bishop of Pakrac
- Term: 1786–1807
- Predecessor: Pavle Avakumović
- Successor: Josif Putnik

Kiril Živković also spelled Kiril Zhivkovich (Bulgarian: Кирил Живкович, Serbian Cyrillic: Кирил Живковић; 1730 – 1807) was a writer and Orthodox bishop.

== Biography ==
Živković was a Bulgarian-born writer and Serbian Orthodox bishop. According to himself, he was born "in the city of Pirot, in Bulgarian lands, in the year 1730". Pirot at the time was part of the Sanjak of Niš of the Ottoman Empire (now in Serbia, then called Bulgaria). As a seven-year-old, he fled with his parents to the village of Futog in Bačka in the Habsburg Empire (now in Serbia), where he was ordained as the priest of the Serbian Patriarchate of Peć. At that time the Patriarchate of Peć had in fact no pure ethnic nature, and included not only Serbs, but also Bulgarians. Afterwards Zhivkovich became a monk at the Bulgarian Orthodox Zograf Monastery on Mount Athos (now in Greece). He travelled and studied throughout the Balkans, Austria, Russia, and Italy. In 1778 he was elevated to the rank of abbot (archimandrite) by Metropolitan Vićentije Jovanović Vidak. That same year he was put in charge of Grgeteg monastery. Eight years later, on the 20th of June 1786, Metropolitan Mojsije Putnik of Sremski Karlovci made him Bishop of the Serbian Orthodox Pakrac eparchy, a position he would hold from 1786 to 1807. He published two books the Austrian Empire: in Vienna in 1794: Domentijan and The Lives of Serbian Saints and Enlighteners Simeon and Sava, and a redaction of John Damascene writings in Buda in 1803. He also left behind several unpublished manuscripts. He died on 12 August 1807 in Pakrac, Habsburg Empire (now in Croatia).

=== Language ===
Most prominent from his unpublished writings is the Manuscript from Temska Monastery. This manuscript is an important document in that it renders the state of the little documented Torlakian dialects from 1764 written, according to the author, in "simple Bulgarian language". In fact during, the 19th century, the Torlakian dialects were often called Bulgarian.

== See also ==
- Viktor Čolakov

== Sources ==
- Василев, В.П. За диалектната основа на един ръкопис от 18 век, в: Българският език през ХХ век, София 2001, с. 280–283.
