= Jakov Ignjatović =

Novelist and writer from Austria-Hungary

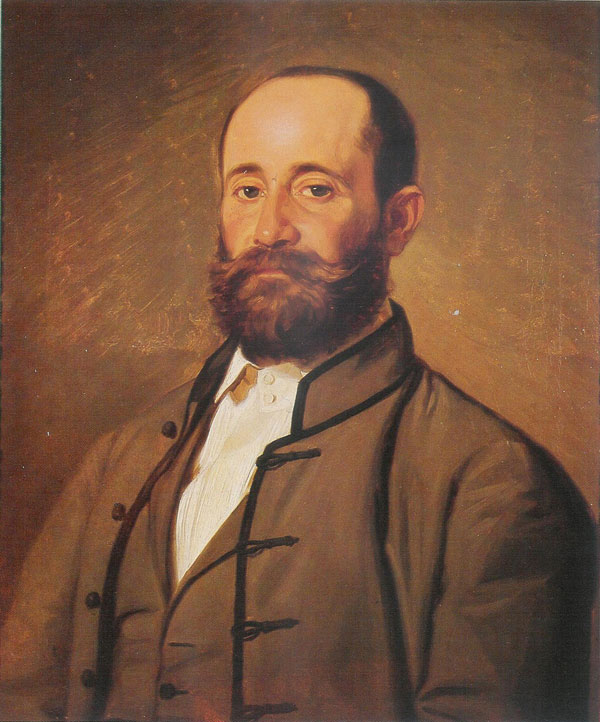
- Portrait of Ignjatović by Novak Radonić
- Born: 8 December 1822; Szentendre, Kingdom of Hungary, Austrian Empire
- Died: 5 July 1889 (aged 66); Újvidék, Austria-Hungary
- Occupation: Poet

Jakov Ignjatović (Serbian Cyrillic: Јаков Игњатовић; 8 December 1822 – 5 July 1889) was a novelist and prose writer, who primarily wrote in Serbian but also in Hungarian. He was also an active member of Matica Srpska.

== Biography ==
Jakov Ignjatović was born in Szentendre on 8 December 1822. He finished elementary school in Szentendre and studied at the Gymnasium in Vác, Esztergom and Pest. He enrolled in Law School at Pest, but left the university and joined the hussars. Later, he graduated law in Kecskemét, where he started his law practice in 1847 for a short time, but during the Hungarian revolution of 1848 in a Romantic fervor, he joined Hungarian forces in fighting against the Austrians, in contradiction to what most Serbs and Croats in Austria of the time did, siding with the empire.

He was briefly arrested when the revolution was suppressed. After the Hungarian defeat, Ignjatović fled to Belgrade. There he worked as a journalist till 1850, and later, he traveled the world. He returned to Hungary in 1853 and took an active part in the cultural and political life of Serbs in Vojvodina.

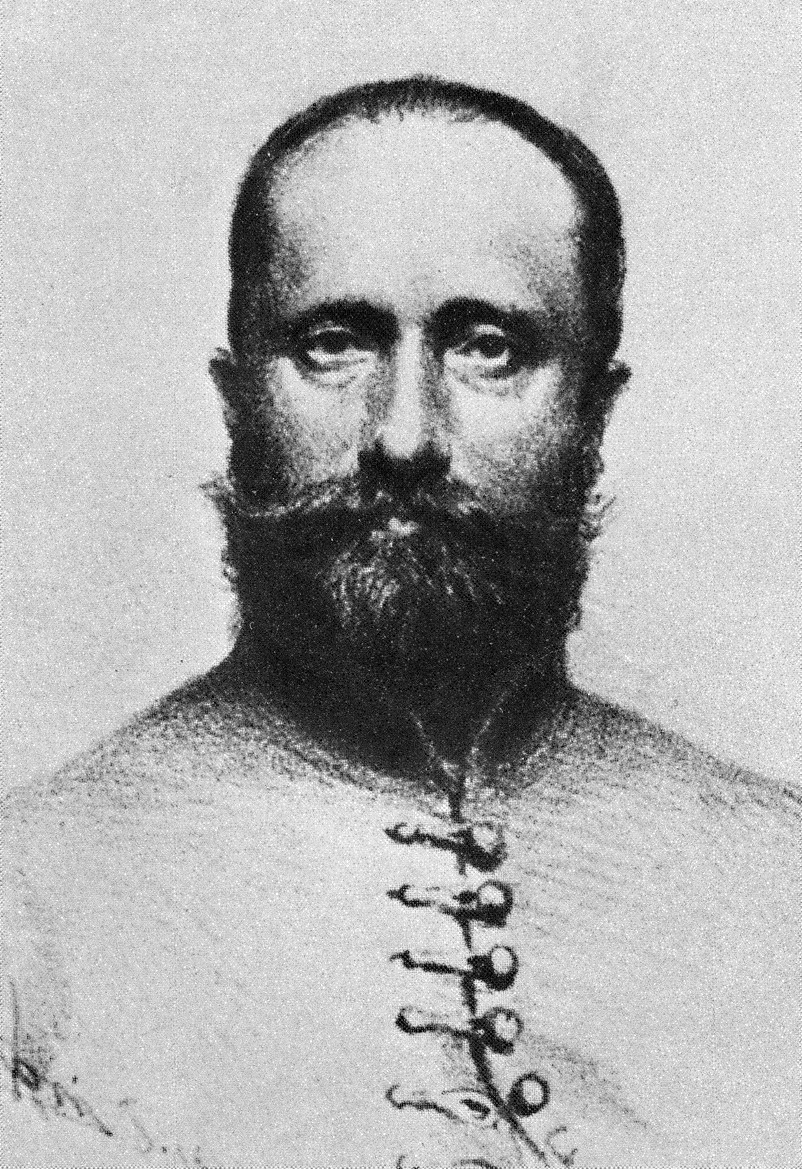
Jakov Ignjatović by József Marastoni

His efforts to secure equal educational privileges for the Slav and Romanian nationalities in the Austrian dominions brought him into disfavor with the German element. He was successively editor of "Letopis Matice srpske" (Serbian Annals), the "Srpske novine" (Serbian News), and the "Nedeljni list" (Weekend Magazine), between 1854 and 1856, and worked as a clerk in Sremski Karlovci and Novi Sad.

He joined Svetozar Miletić's People's Party in its political fight against Austria and was a member of the Hungarian diet twice. After the People's Party split with Hungary, he remained loyal to the Hungarian authorities, like Janos Damjanich and Sebo Vukovics, and unlike the majority of the Serbs living in Vojvodina. And because of that, Ignjatović was seen as a traitor by his compatriots, and lived in isolation until death. This had a bad influence on his writing career, but he still managed to leave a literary legacy behind him just the same (among the Hungarians and Serbs alike).

Ignjatović turned to novel writing rather late in life, perhaps influenced by the second half of the nineteenth century, then under the domination of science. Like most writers of the day, he sought to utilize as much as possible the facts and theories of science and to make the novel or drama an instrument of scientific observation and discussion.

The Realists purported to create a school of "applied literature". The ultimate goal of the school was, first, exact and almost photographic delineation of the accidents of modern life, and secondly, non-suppression of the essential features and functions of that life which are usually suppressed. Jakov Ignjatović, Djordje Rajković (who collaborated with Ignjatović in 1885 and 1886 on a magazine called Bršljan) and Svetozar Marković belonged to this movement.

Ignjatović was elected a member of the Serbian Royal Academy in 1888. At the end of life, possibly as a result of deteriorating health, he lost most of his fortune and died as a vagrant in Novi Sad in 1899.

== Works ==
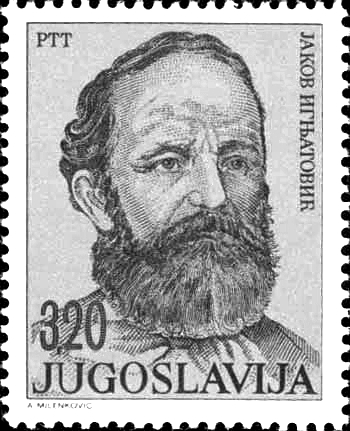
Jakov Ignjatović on a 1975 Yugoslavia stamp

Ignjatović did not hesitate to draw largely on his own personal adventures and profess to portray human life, not as a fairy-tale, but as "stuff on which to try the soul's strength." Among Jakov Ignjatović's best novels are Vasa Rešpekt (Basil the Respectable), Večiti Mladoženja (The Eternal Groom), Patnica (A Burdened Woman), Trpen Spašen (The Suffered Saved), and Milan Nerandžić. All these novels form a prominent landmark in the development of Serbian prose fiction.

The plots of Ignjatović's novels are ingenious in conception and skillfully crafted. He has no pretensions to the brilliance of Gogol (with whom he's been often compared), but his amusing dialogue arises naturally out of the situation, and its wit is never strained.

Vasa Rešpekt (1875) opens with a praise of the town of Szentandre, the location in which this story is framed. The hero of the embedded story, Vasa Ognjan, leaves the town early, lives most of his life in perpetual poverty, and gets into conflict with the authorities, but distinguishes himself as somewhat of a daredevil in battles. In 1848, he fights on the Hungarian side, though not out of political conviction, and he asks to be transferred when he is supposed to fight his fellow Serbs.

If Vasa Rešpekt is a romantic story revolving around an identity crisis, Večiti mladoženja (1878) is a humorous story about two generations of Szendendre Serbs. The first describes in great detail the preparation and departure of a well-to-do merchant on a trip to Cracow fair of 1812; the second part is focused on his no-good sons who fight among themselves for the inheritance and finally waste it.

His characters are original, and the incidents and adventures in which they are mixed up are represented in a manner by a man who understood the resources of the theatre as well. The spontaneity and verve with which his adventurous characters are drawn have suggested that in his favourite type he was describing himself and all those he knew around him, however intimately. The code of morals followed by these characters is open to criticism, but they are human and genial in their roguery, and compare with the creations of contemporary novels.

== Bibliography ==
Novels:

- "Đurađ Branković" (Đurađ Branković)
- "Kraljevska snaha" (Royal Daughter-in-law)
- "Deli-Bakić" - unfinished
- "Čudan svet" (Strange World)
- "Vasa Rešpekt" (Basil the Respectable)
- "Večiti mladoženja" (Eternal Bridegroom)
- "Stari i novi majstori" (Old and New Masters)
- "Patnica"
- "Trideset godina iz života Milana Narandžića" (Thirty Years of the Life of Milan Narandžić)

Short stories:

- "Krv za rod" (Blood for the People)
- "Manzor i Džemila" (Manzor & Džemila)

== See also ==
- Serbian literature
