= Nikola Aleksić =

Serbian artist

- Early image of Aleksić
- Born: January 1, 1808; Stari Bečej, Austrian Empire
- Died: January 1, 1873 (aged 65); Arad, Austria-Hungary
- Style: Icon artist in the style of Nazarene movement, Biedermeier

Nikola Aleksić (1808 – 1 January 1873) was a Serbian artist. He was under the influence of the painting styles of the Nazarene movement and Biedermeier.

== Biography ==
He came from a family of artists in Stari Bečej. He was taught painting at the studio of Arsenije Teodorović of Novi Sad until 1826. Then, he went to Vienna and enrolled at the Academy of Fine Arts (1828–1830).

Later, he traveled to Italy to broaden his art education. There he honed his craft for three years, getting to know the art of the Nazarene movement, and making a living from portrait painting. He also copied old masters in the city's galleries and painted portraits of Austrian officers of Serbian descent. In 1834 he left Italy for Novi Sad, then he went to Sremski Karlovci, where he made a portrait of Metropolitan Stefan Stratimirović.

After three years of working in the Principality of Serbia, he was drawn back to his childhood haunts. In 1837, he settled in Kikinda, where he opened his own atelier. From there he moved to Timișoara in 1840 and later settled in Arad, where his relatives lived and where spent the rest of his life. Artists Novak Radonić and Aksentije Marodić were his apprentices. In Timișoara, he married Marija Stankić, a beautiful Serbian woman from Verona. Nikola's successors, son Dušan and his two grandsons Stevan and Ivan were also prominent painters.

== Works ==
He is considered the most productive Serbian painter in the first half of the nineteenth century. He did approximately a thousand icons and many neo-classicistic portraits. Among his first religious works are the icons in the iconostasis and the vault of the Serbian church in Mol and the iconostasis in the Romanian church in Fibiş, near Temisvar (1837–1838).

- 1837. Iconostasis in the Serbian church in Mol)
- 1838. Iconostasis in the Romanian church in Fibiş
- 1839. Iconostasis and frescoes in the Serbian church in Banatsko Aranđelovo
- 1841. Iconostasis in the Romanian church in Kovin
- 1845. Iconostasis in the Serbian church in Sânmartinu Sârbesc
- 1845–1846. Frescoes in the Serbian church in Arad
- 1846. Iconostasis in Serbian church in Srpski Sveti Petar (Sânpetru Mare, Romania)
- 1847. Iconostasis in the Serbian church in Elemir
- 1848. Frescoes in the Serbian church in Novi Kneževac
- 1854. Iconostasis and frescoes in Kumane
- 1855. Iconostasis in Novo Miloševo
- 1857. Frescoes in the Serbian church in Mokrin
- 1858. Iconostasis in Radojevo
- 1859. Frescoes in the church in Melenci
- 1861. Iconostasis in the Serbian church in Mali Bečkerek, now Zrenjanin
- 1862. Iconostasis in the Serbian church in Variaş
- 1863. Iconostasis in the Romanian church in Arad
- 1865–1866. Iconostasis in the Serbian church in Arad
- 1867. Iconostasis in the church in Micălaca, near Arad
- 1868–1869. Iconostasis in the Serbian church in Gospođinci
- 1870–1871. Iconostasis and frescoes in the Serbian church in Ostojićevo

== Gallery ==
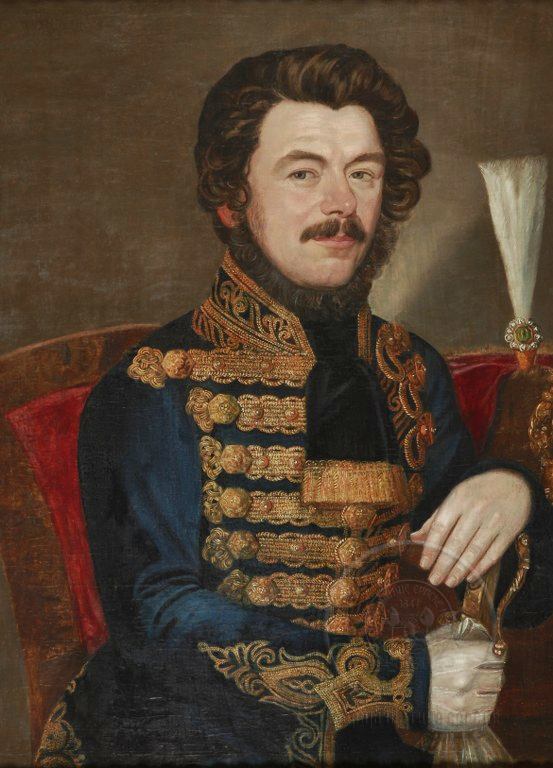
Painting of Jovan Stefanović Vilovski, painted by Aleksić in about 1850 and is from the collection of Matica Srpska in Novi Sad

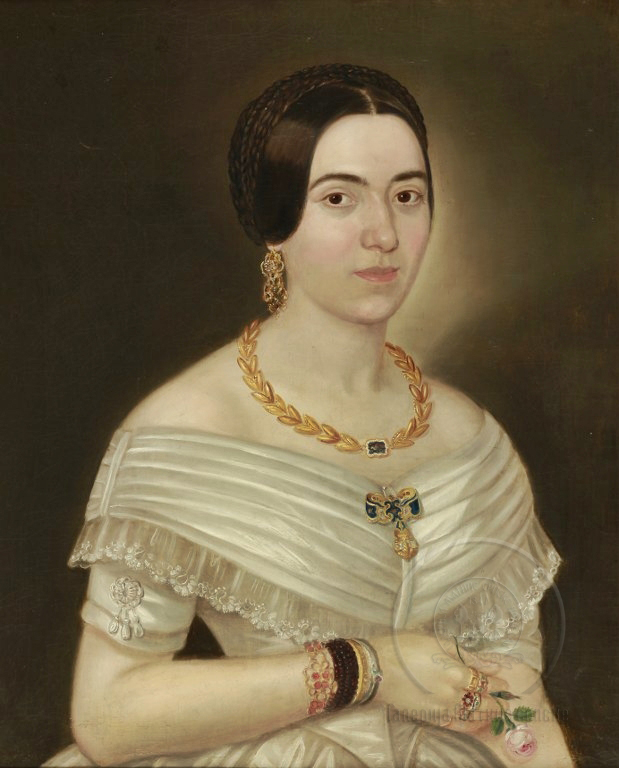
Dame in White, from 1851, from the collection of Matica Srpska in Novi Sad

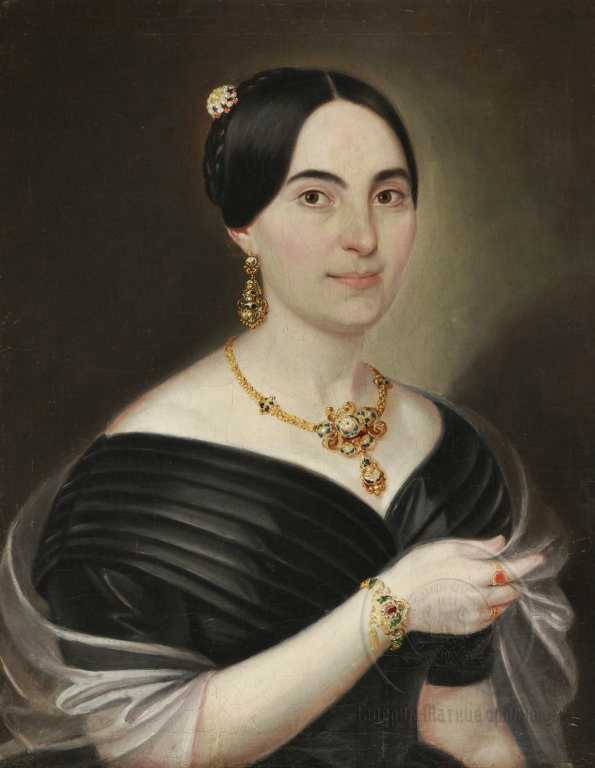
Jelena Vilovski, from about 1850, from the collection of Matica Srpska in Novi Sad

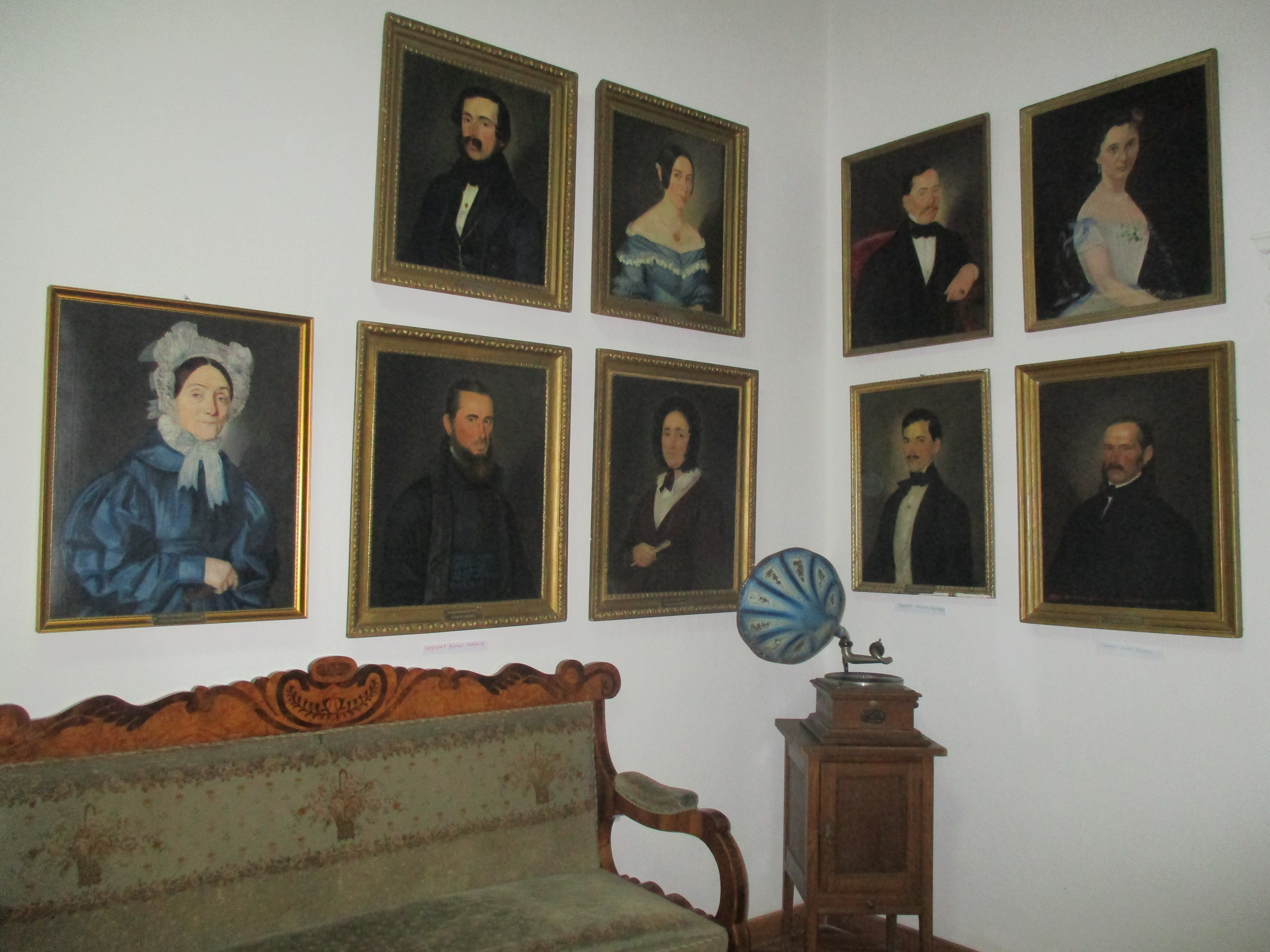
A collection of portraits by the artist at the National Museum in Kikinda.

== See also ==
- List of painters from Serbia
- Serbian art
