= Temska manuscript =

1764 collection compiled by Kiril Zhivkovich

Temska Manuscript (Bulgarian: Темски ръкопис, Serbian: Темски рукопис/Temski rukopis) is a collection of writings from 1764, compiled by the monk Kiril Zhivkovich (1730–1807) in the Temska Monastery near the village of Temska, in Pirot district. The title of the manuscript is "Из душевного обреда в’ неделных днех слова избрана. На прости язык болгарскій". - "Selected words from the weekly spiritual rituals. In simple Bulgarian language". The manuscript consists of 232 sheets, where 34 writings are collected. The basic languages of the manuscript are the Torlakian dialect and Church Slavonic, with some Russian influences. This manuscript is a monument, reflecting the state of transitional dialects between Bulgarian and Serbian in the middle of 18th century. Today this manuscript is stored in the Library of Matica Srpska in Novi Sad under № PP 169.

== Sources ==
- Василев, В.П. Темският ръкопис – български езиков паметник от 1764 г, Paleobulgarica, IX (1986), кн. 1, с. 49-72.
- Василев, В.П. За диалектната основа на един ръкопис от 18 век, в: Българският език през ХХ век, София 2001, с. 280-283.
