= Arsenije Teodorović =

Serbian painter

Arsenije Teodorović (Serbian: Арсен Теодоровић, Perlez, Habsburg monarchy, 1767 – Novi Sad, Habsburg Monarchy, 13 February 1826) was a Serbian painter from the Banat region of Vojvodina who is widely considered one of Serbia's foremost portraitists. His best known work is the portrait of Dositej Obradović, the father of modern Serbian literature. Shortly before he died, Teodorović bequeathed more than 1,000 paintings to the founder of the Arts and Crafts School of the Metropolitanate of Karlovci, Stefan Stratimirović.

== Career ==
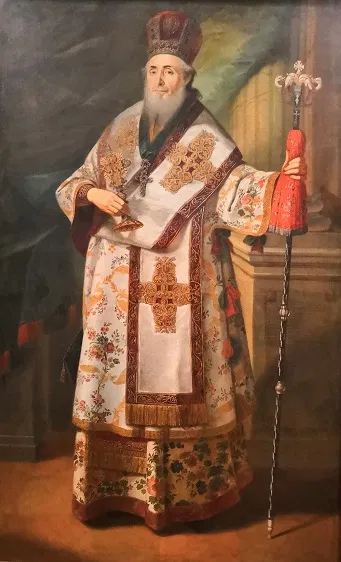
Kiril Živković, bishop of Pakrac, 1799

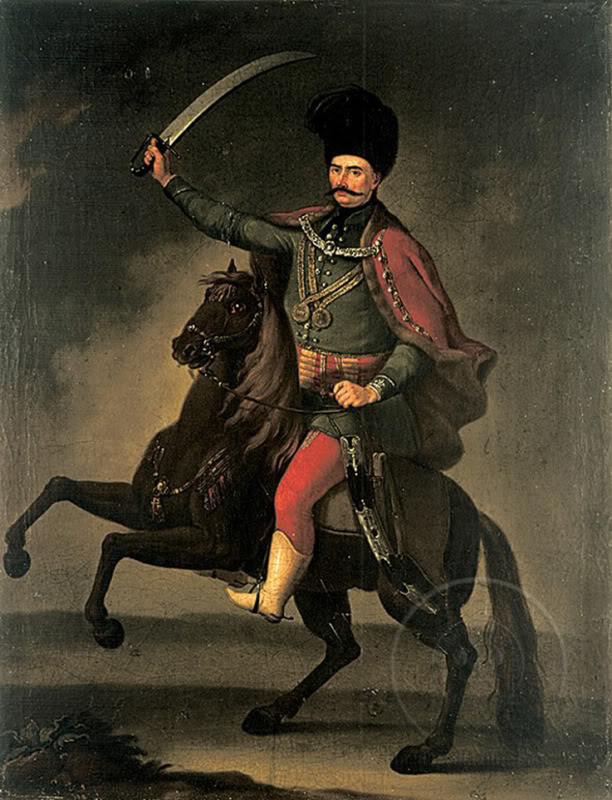
Portrait of Bogić Vučković, 1812

He studied at the Academy of Fine Arts Vienna from 1788 until 1796, and then lived in Timișoara and Novi Sad. He was engaged in portrait painting and painting icons for the sanctuary screens (iconostasis), and he also painted some historical compositions as well.

Teodorović's portrait of Dositej Obradović is considered to be one of the first, modern Serbian civic portraitures. With this portrait, Teodorović placed himself in a Serbian Biedermeier school that include Pavel Đurković, Nikola Aleksić, Konstantin Danil, Jeftimije Popović (1791–1832) and others. Portraits of writer Avram Mrazović, merchant Gavrilo Bozitovac (1819), priest Simeon Kojić and his wife Makrena Kojić (1825), and bishop Kiril Živković are further examples of Arsenije Teodorović's masterly style. He even more clearly exhibited his classicist tendencies painting his icons and his allegorical and historical compositions. In Sremski Karlovci Teodorović managed the Drawing School, through which he significantly influenced the next generation of artists.

As far as it is known today, he authored 26 sanctuary screens that still can be found in Serbian Orthodox churches throughout Hungary, Romania, Croatia and Serbia:Baja, Hungary, 1793; Futog, 1798; Pakrac, 1800; Vršac, 1808; Sânnicolau Mare, 1809; Buda, 1818; Saravale, 1811; Novi Sad, 1811; Sremska Mitrovica, 1815; Zrenjanin, 1817; Bavanište, 1818; Mol (Ada) and others.

== Works ==
His work can be found today at art museums and churches:

- The Town Museum of Sombor
- Serbian Orthodox Diocesan Museum in Szentendre
- Gallery of Matica Srpska in Novi Sad
- Arte Galerija of Belgrade

== See also ==
- List of painters from Serbia
- Serbian art
- Janko Halkozović

== Literature ==
- St. Todorović, O srpskom slikaru Arsi Teodoroviću, Naše doba 1882 - 14
- V. Stajić Novosadske biografije V Novi sad 1940 (153–156)
- M. Kolarić, Klasicizam kod Srba, Beograd 1965 (93–98)
- Tekst dr Midraga Kolarića za Enciklopediju Jugoslavije JLZ Zagreb 1972
