= Mol (Ada) =

Mol Мол (Serbian) Mohol (Hungarian)
- Town
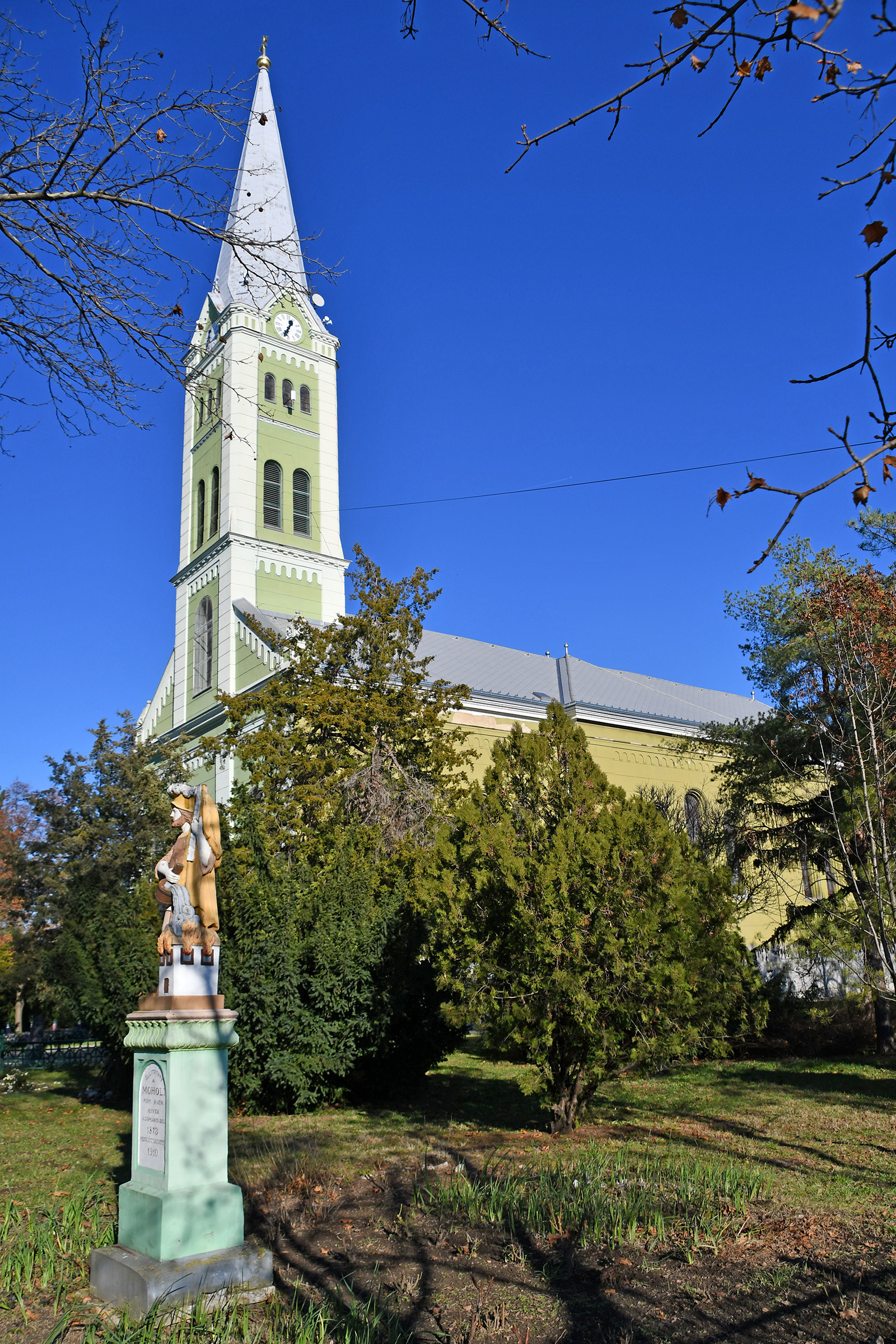
- The Roman Catholic Church in Mol

- Location of Mol within Serbia Mol (Serbia) Mol (Europe)
- Coordinates: 45°45′31″N 20°07′31″E
- Country: Serbia
- Province: Vojvodina
- District: North Banat
- Municipalities: Ada
- Elevation: 69 m (226 ft)

Population (2011)
  - Mol: 6,009
- Time zone: UTC+1 (CET)
  - Summer (DST): UTC+2 (CEST)
- Postal code: 24435
- Area code: +381(0)24
- Vehicle registration: SA

Mol (Serbian Cyrillic: Мол, Hungarian: Mohol) is a town located in the Ada municipality, in the North Banat District of Serbia. It is situated in the Autonomous Province of Vojvodina. The town has a Hungarian ethnic majority (62.14%) and it has a population of 6,009 (2011 census).

== Ethnic groups (2002 census) ==
- Hungarians = 4,217 (62.14%)
- Serbs = 2,189 (32.26%)
- Roma = 153 (2.26%)
- others

== Historical population ==
- 1948: 8,275
- 1953: 8,121
- 1961: 8,097
- 1971: 8,128
- 1981: 7,950
- 1991: 7,522
- 2002: 6,786
- 2011: 6,009

== Sites ==
St. Sava Orthodox Church in Mol, built in early 19th century, is protected as a cultural monument of great importance. It contains works of Arsenije Teodorović, Nikola Aleksić and Mol's native Novak Radonić.

== Notable citizens ==
- Norbert Könyves (1989– ), born in Senta, professional footballer who plays for Hungarian club Zalaegerszegi TE
- László Moholy-Nagy (1895–1946), Hungarian architect, painter and photographer, notable professor of the Bauhaus school
- Jovan Radonić (1873–1956), historian, member of Serbian Academy of Sciences and Arts
- Novak Radonić (1826–1890), painter and writer

== See also ==
- List of places in Serbia
- List of cities, towns and villages in Vojvodina
