= Historical Archives "Toplica" of Prokuplje =

- Историјски архив Топлице Прокупље (Serbian)

Agency overview
- Formed: 1960; 66 years ago
- Jurisdiction: Government of Serbia
- Headquarters: Prokuplje, Serbia
- Parent agency: State Archives of Serbia
- Website: Official website

Map
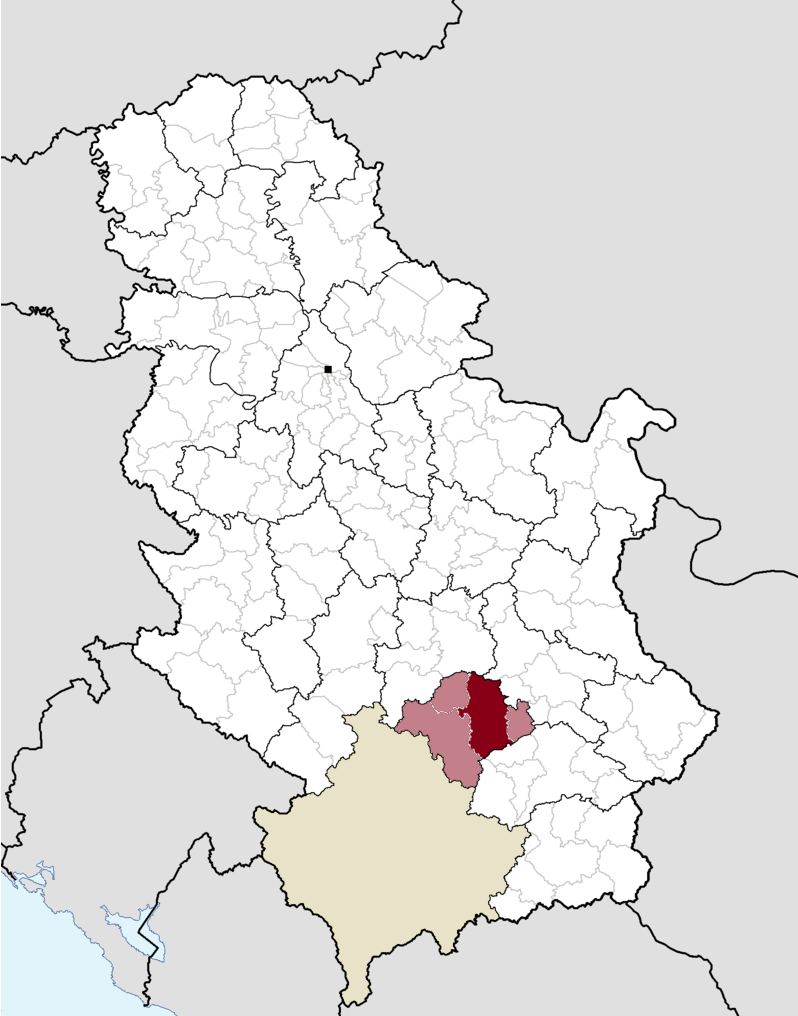
- Area served by the archives shown on the map of Serbia

The Historical Archives "Toplica" of Prokuplje (Serbian: Историјски архив Топлице Прокупље) are the primary institution responsible for preservation of archival materials in the Toplica District located in Prokuplje, Serbia. The archive is primarily serving municipalities of Prokuplje, Žitorađa, Blace, and Kuršumlija. The Historical Archives were first mentioned between 1948 and 1951 as the Archives Center under a decree by the Ministry of Education of the People's Republic of Serbia. In 1960, the Prokuplje Archival Center was officially established as part of the Historical Archive of Niš. From 1989 to 2006, it functioned as the Archival Department within the Municipality of Prokuplje and in 2006, it was formally re-established as the Historical Archives of Toplica in its current legal capacities of regional archival centre. In 2017 the archive hosted 50 archival experts from around Serbia on a professional training in handling archival materials. The new archival depo was opened in 2023.

== See also ==
- List of archives in Serbia
- State Archives of Serbia
