= Historical Archives "Ras" of Novi Pazar =

- Историјски архив „Рас“ Нови Пазар (Serbian); Historijski arhiv "Ras" Novi Pazar (Bosnian)

Agency overview
- Formed: 1980; 46 years ago
- Jurisdiction: Government of Serbia
- Headquarters: Ulica oslobođenja 41, 20 000 Novi Pazar, Serbia
- Parent agency: State Archives of Serbia
- Website: Official website

Map
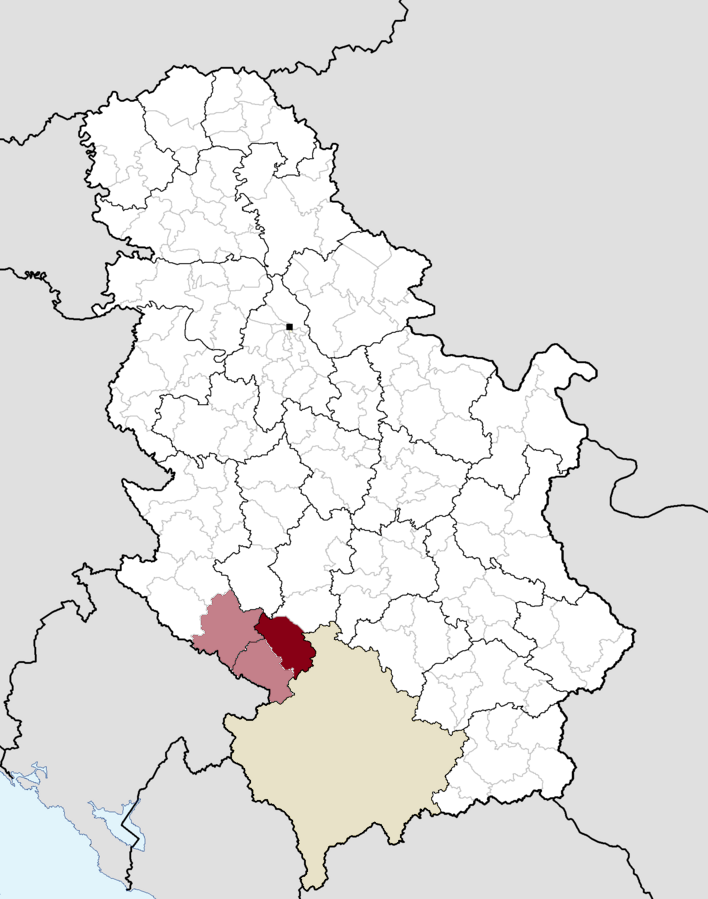
- Area served by the archives shown on the map of Serbia

The Historical Archives "Ras" of Novi Pazar (Serbian: Историјски архив „Рас“ Нови Пазар, Bosnian: Historijski arhiv "Ras" Novi Pazar) are the primary institution responsible for preservation of archival materials in southern parts of the Raška District and Zlatibor District located in Novi Pazar, Serbia. The archives are primarily serving municipalities of Novi Pazar, Tutin, and Sjenica.

The Historical Archives "Ras" are located in the former building of the District Court in Novi Pazar, at 41 Oslobođenja Street. In 1986, that building was declared a cultural monument - the Old Court Building in Novi Pazar.

== History ==
The Historical Archives "Ras" in Novi Pazar are one of the youngest archival institutions in Serbia. They were established on 26 June 1980 by the decision of the Self-Management Interest Community for Culture of the Novi Pazar Municipality, when the Archival Department of the Historical Archives of Kraljevo became an independent archival institution. The archival holdings of the Historical Archives "Ras" are divided into three key periods. Ottoman Period includes a collection of documents in oriental languages, among which the Sidžili of the Novi Pazar Kadija (court records) are of the greatest historiographical significance. The period from 1912 to 1944 includes records such as the books of minutes of the Novi Pazar Municipality (1913–1929) and the fund of the Novi Pazar Gymnasium, which was established in November 1913. Much of the material from this period was destroyed during the Allied bombing of Novi Pazar in 1944. Post-World War II Period features extensive records from local government bodies, courts, educational, cultural, health institutions, and economic entities in the Novi Pazar, Sjenica, and Tutin areas.

== See also ==
- List of archives in Serbia
- State Archives of Serbia
- Historical Archives of Kraljevo
- Historical Archives of Užice
