= Historical Archives of Požarevac =

- Историјски архив Пожаревац (Serbian)

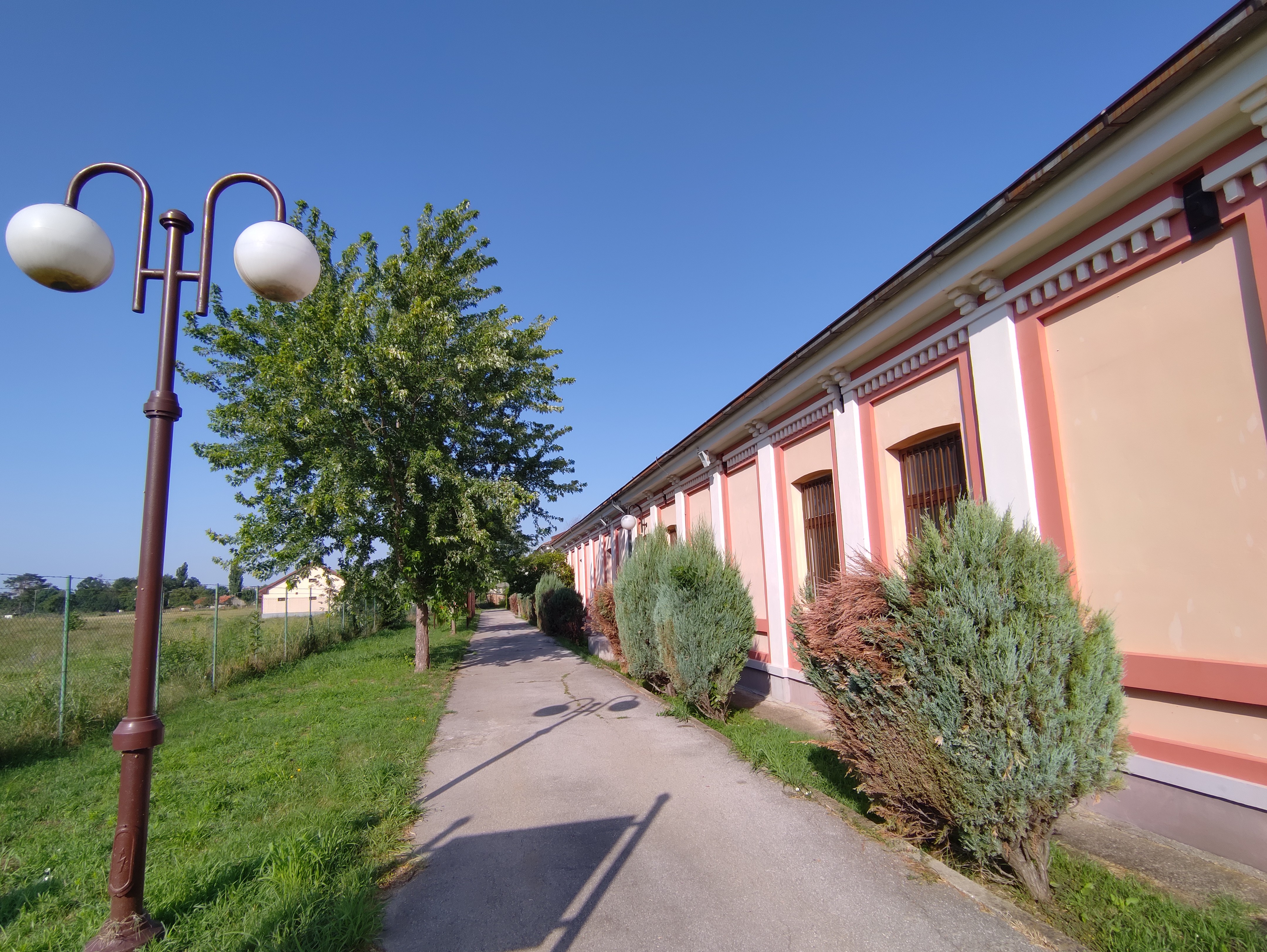

Agency overview
- Formed: 1948; 78 years ago
- Jurisdiction: Government of Serbia
- Headquarters: Dr Vojislava Dulića 10, 12000 Požarevac, Serbia
- Parent agency: State Archives of Serbia
- Website: Official website

Map
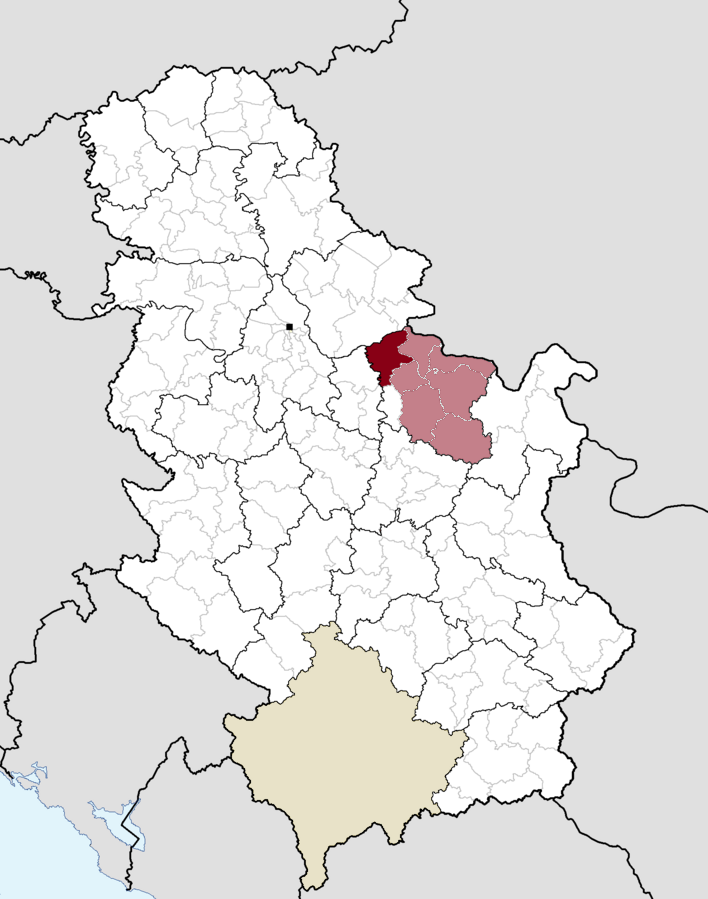
- Area served by the archives shown on the map of Serbia

The Historical Archives of Požarevac (Serbian: Историјски архив Пожаревац) are the primary institution responsible for preservation of archival materials in most of the Braničevo District (except Žabari covered by the Archive in Smederevska Palanka) located in Požarevac, Serbia. The archive is primarily serving municipalities of Požarevac, Žagubica, Kučevo, Golubac, Malo Crniće, Petrovac, and Veliko Gradište. The Historical Archives of Požarevac were established as an archival center in 1948, by the then City People's Committee of Požarevac. The archives hold and preserve 554 archival collections and funds amounting to about 5,000 linear meters of records, covering the period from the late 18th to the late 20th century.

== See also ==
- List of archives in Serbia
- State Archives of Serbia
