= Historical Archives of Kruševac =

- Историјски архив Крушевац (Serbian)

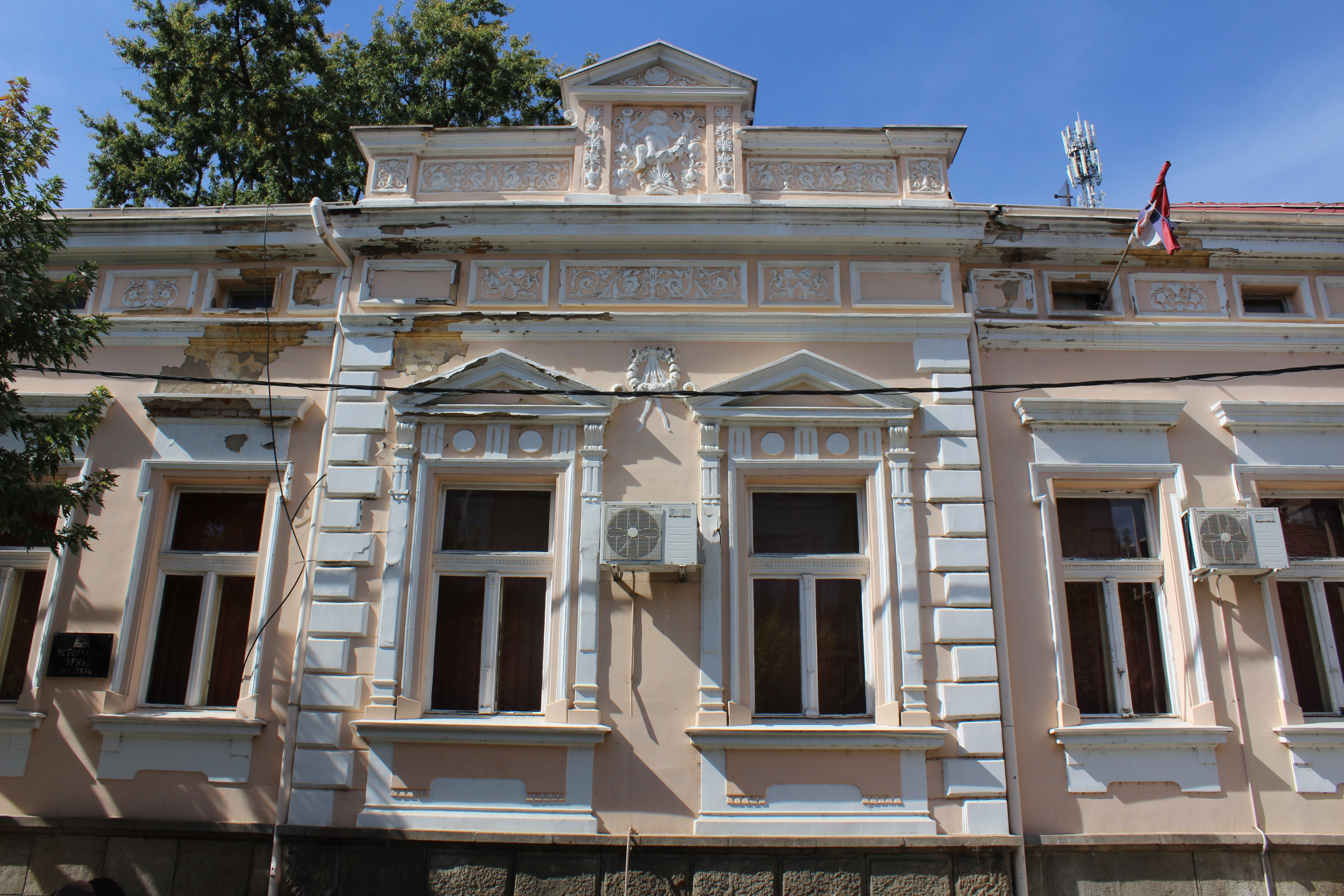
- The archives building

Agency overview
- Formed: 1948; 78 years ago
- Jurisdiction: Government of Serbia
- Headquarters: Kruševac, Serbia
- Parent agency: State Archives of Serbia
- Website: Official website

Map
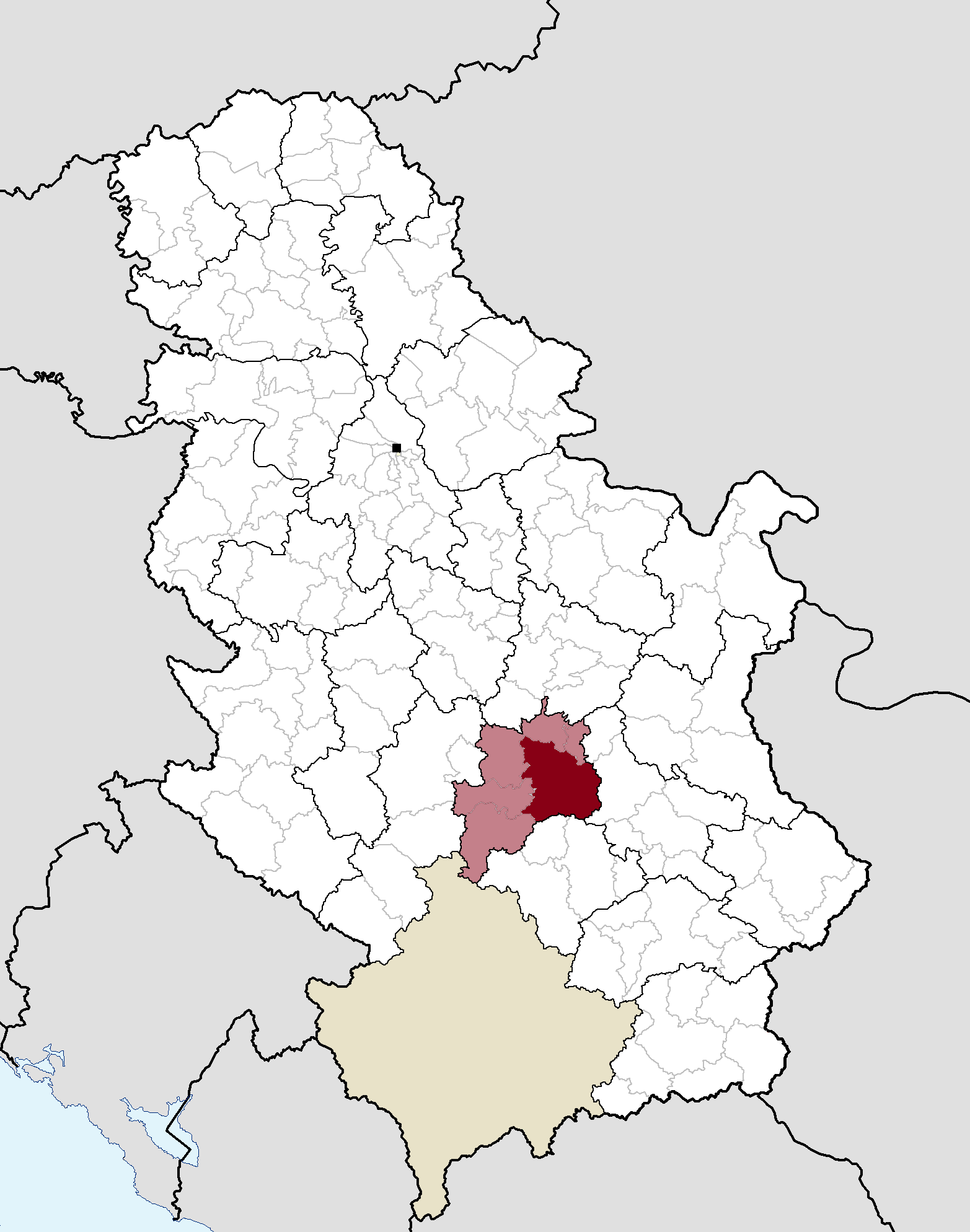
- Area served by the archives shown on the map of Serbia

The Historical Archives of Kruševac (Serbian: Историјски архив Крушевац) are the primary institution responsible for preservation of archival materials in the Rasina District located in Kruševac, Serbia. The archives are primarily serving municipalities of Kruševac, Ćićevac, Varvarin, Trstenik, Aleksandrovac, and Brus.

== Background ==
The archives were established in March 1948 by the Ministry of Education of the People's Republic of Serbia as an archival centre for Kruševac and surrounding areas and gained the status of an independent institution in 1952. The current name of the institution was introduced in 1958. Between 1962 and 1968 the archives ere merged with the local museum but subsequently once again continued working as an independent institution. The archives hold over 7,000 linear meters of documentation in 849 archival fonds, including personal and family collections, covering the period from 1834 to present time.

== See also ==
- List of archives in Serbia
- State Archives of Serbia
