= Zaječar Historical Archive =

Historical Archive "Timočka krajina" of Zaječar
- Историјски архив „Тимочка крајина“ Зајечар (Serbian)

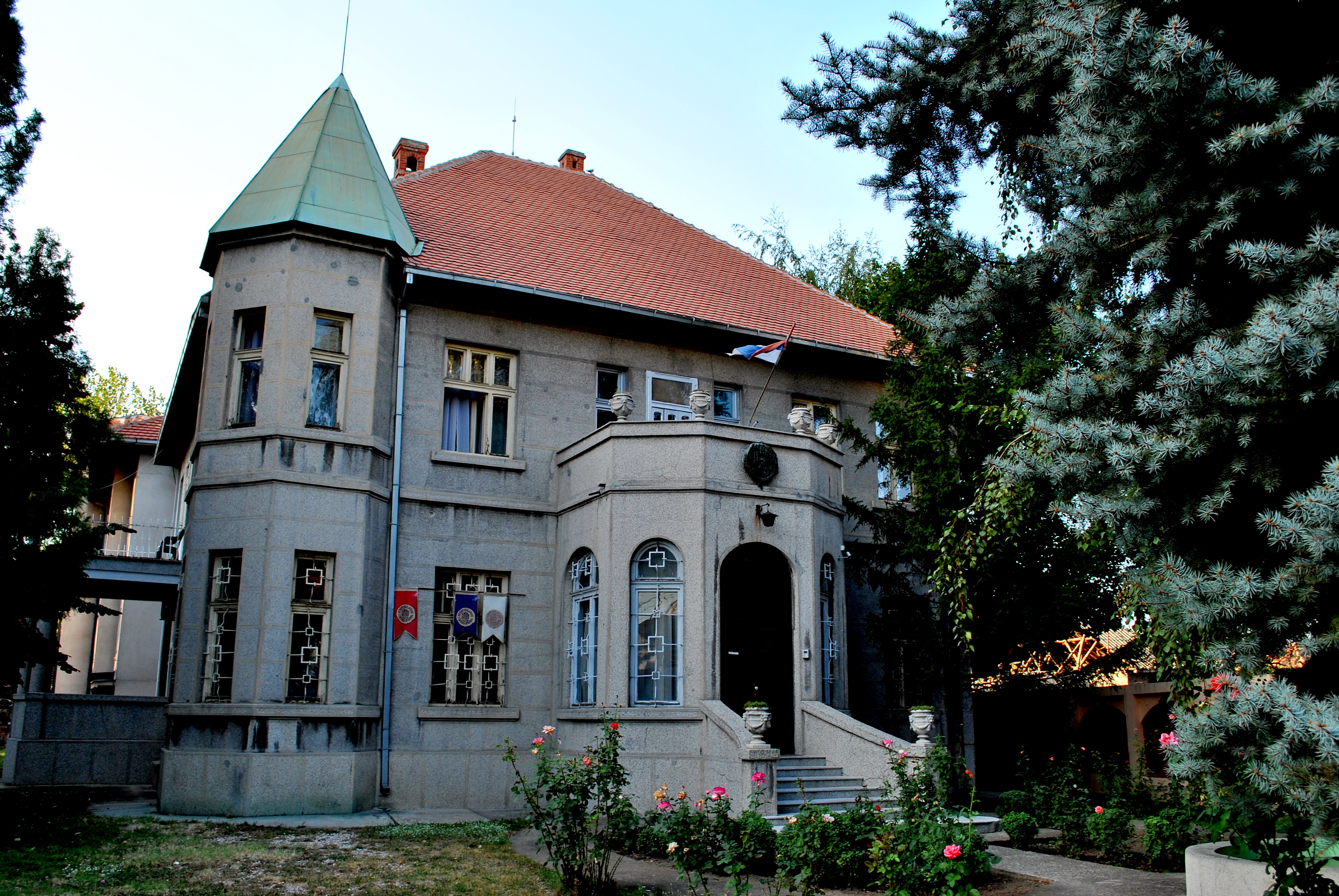

Agency overview
- Formed: 15 April 1948 1948; 78 years ago
- Jurisdiction: Government of Serbia
- Headquarters: Zaječar, Serbia
- Parent agency: Archive of Serbia
- Website: Official website

Map
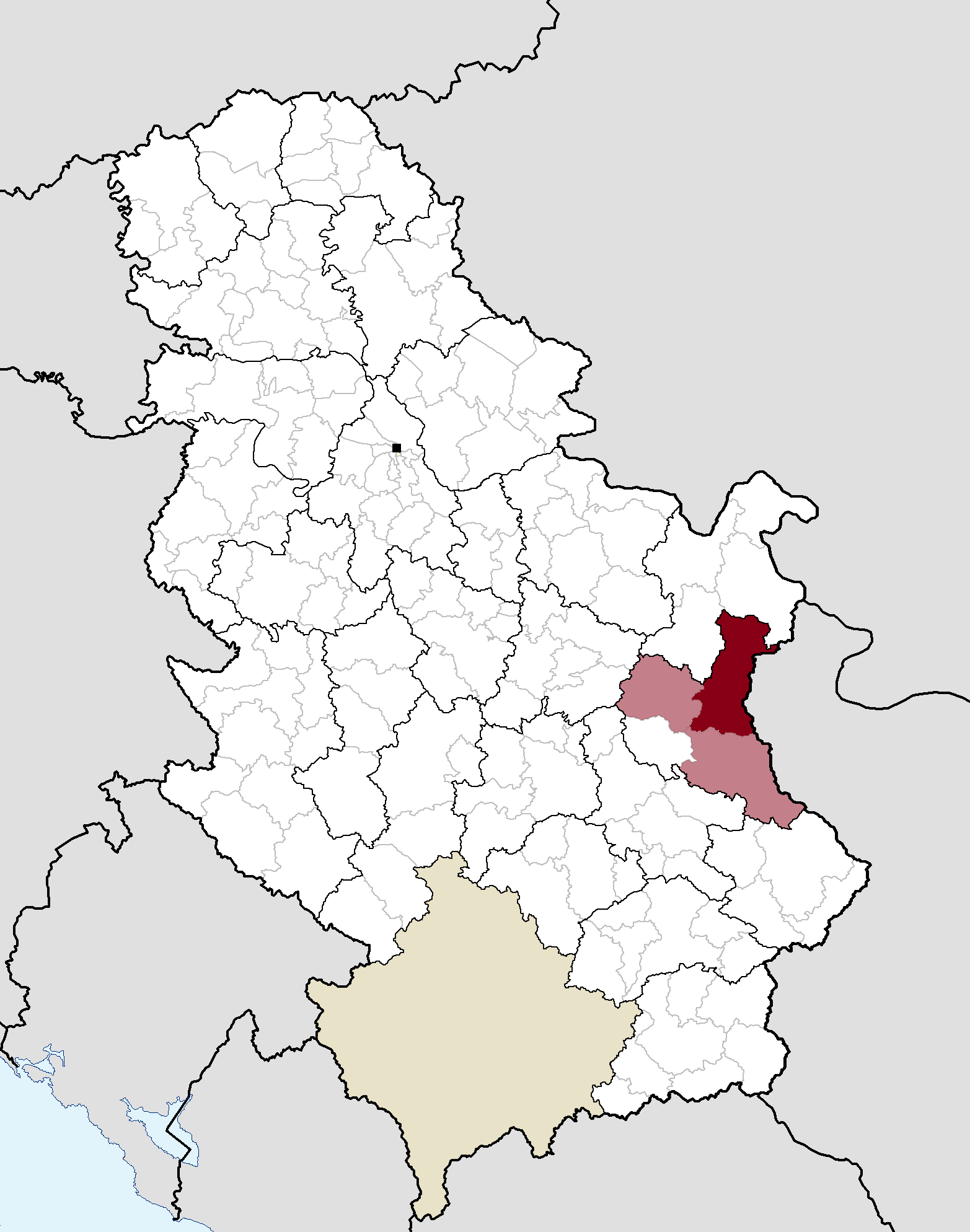
- Area served by the archive shown on the map of Serbia

The Historical Archive "Timočka krajina" of Zaječar (Serbian Cyrillic: Историјски архив „Тимочка крајина“ Зајечар), known formerly and commonly as the Zaječar Historical Archive (Историјски архив Зајечар), is the primary institution responsible for preservation of archival materials in most of the Zaječar District located in Zaječar, Serbia. The archive is primarily serving municipalities of Zaječar, Boljevac and Knjaževac.

== Background ==
The Historical Archive in Zaječar was established on April 15, 1948, following the orders of the Government and the Ministry of Education of the People's Republic of Serbia. In 1951 the archive was renamed the "City state archive", and in 1973 it received the official name Historical Archive "Timočka krajina" (Историјски архив „Тимочка крајина”).

The archive holds over 3,000 linear meters of archival materials, organized into 485 collections and document groups. Eleven collections are designated as materials of exceptional significance. Additionally, the archive's library, containing over 10,000 books, is recognized as a cultural asset of great importance. The Historical Archive of Zaječar publishes a professional journal and has received numerous awards, including the Order of Merit for the People with a Silver Star and the Golden Archive Award for 2006.

The building that currently houses the Historical Archive was constructed in 1932, designed by local architect P. Đorđević as a residence for Milan Savić, a wealthy mine owner. In December 1978, the building was purchased by the state to serve the needs of the Historical Archive. In 1984, it was declared a cultural asset and designated as a monument of culture, ensuring its protection and preservation.

== See also ==
- List of archives in Serbia
- Archive of Serbia
