= Historical Archives of Kraljevo =

- Историјски архив Краљево (Serbian)

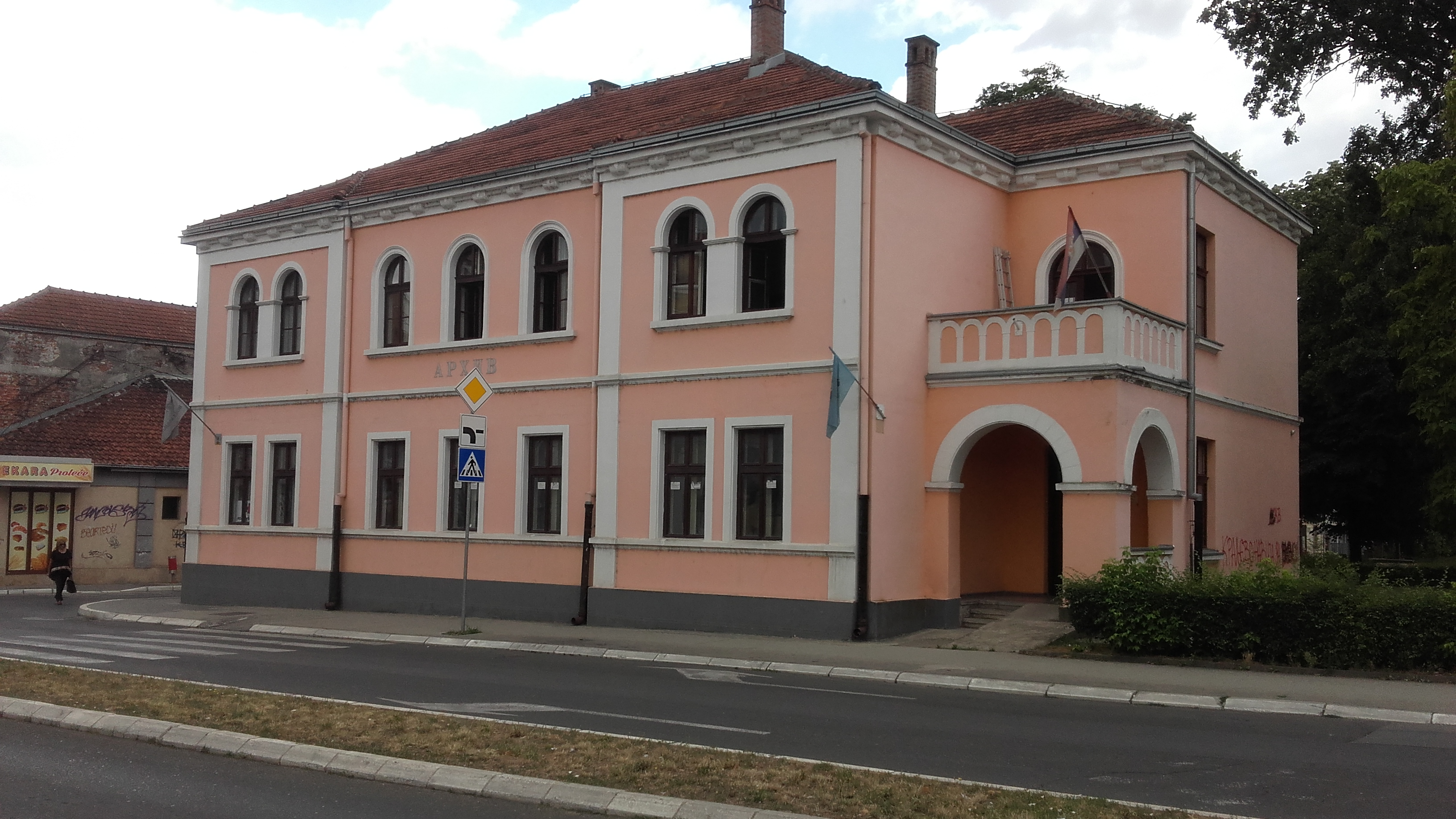
- Building housing the archives

Agency overview
- Formed: 1960; 66 years ago
- Jurisdiction: Government of Serbia
- Headquarters: Kraljevo, Serbia
- Parent department: State Archives of Serbia
- Website: Official website

Map
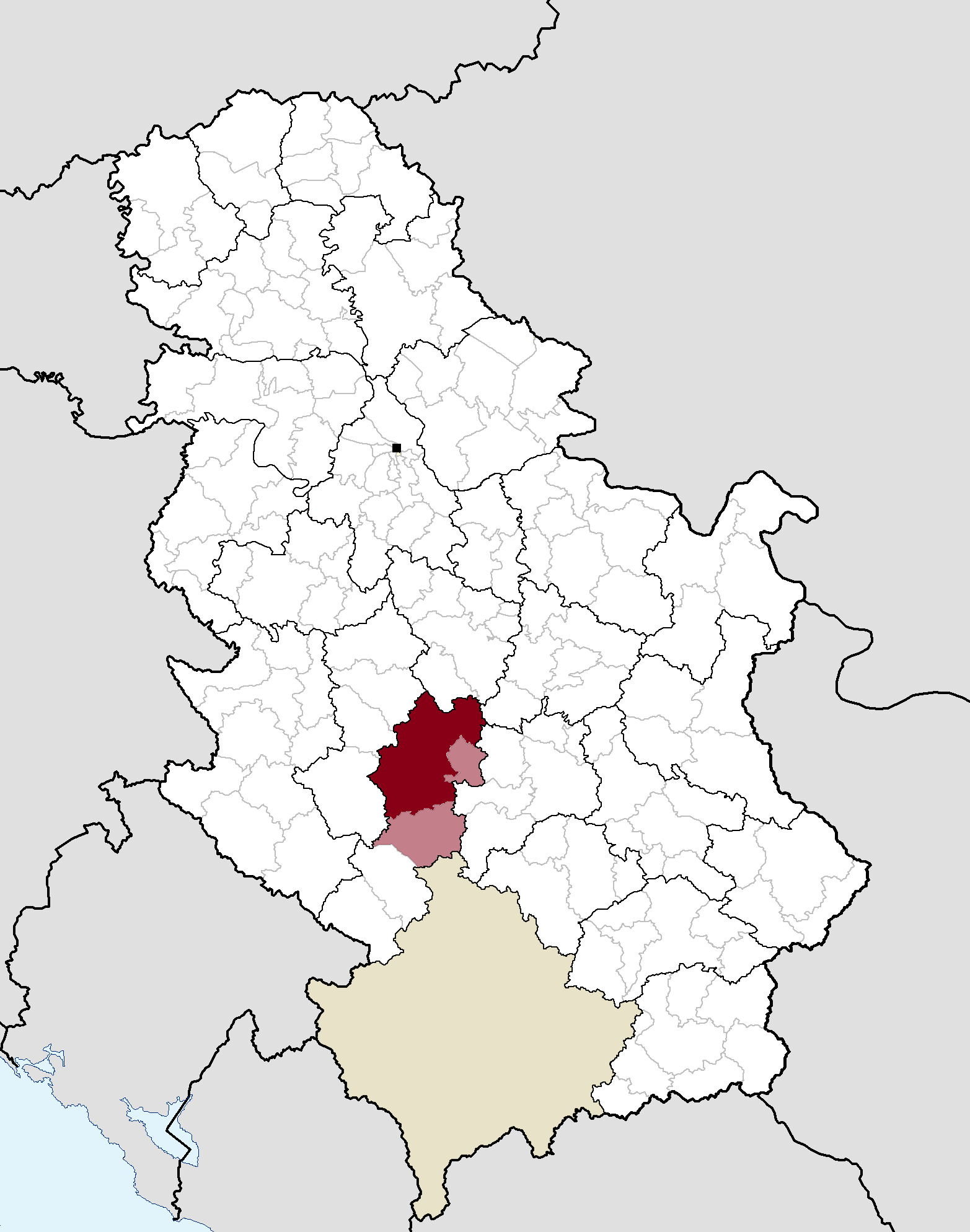
- Area served by the archives shown on the map of Serbia

The Historical Archives of Kraljevo (Serbian: Историјски архив Краљево) are the primary institution responsible for preservation of archival materials in northern and central part of the Raška District located in Kraljevo, Serbia. The archives are primarily covering municipalities of Kraljevo, Vrnjačka Banja, and Raška. Together with the National Museum of Kraljevo the archive publishes peer reviewed annual journal Naša prošlost.

== History ==
Initially, until 1980 the institution served the territory of Novi Pazar, Sjenica, and Tutin municipalities as well that are today served by the Historical Archives "Ras" of Novi Pazar. In 2020, during the COVID-19 pandemic in Serbia archive marked its 60th anniversary with small scale events conditioned by epidemic prevention rules.

== See also ==
- List of archives in Serbia
- State Archives of Serbia
