= Historical Archives of Negotin =

- Историјски архив Неготин (Serbian)

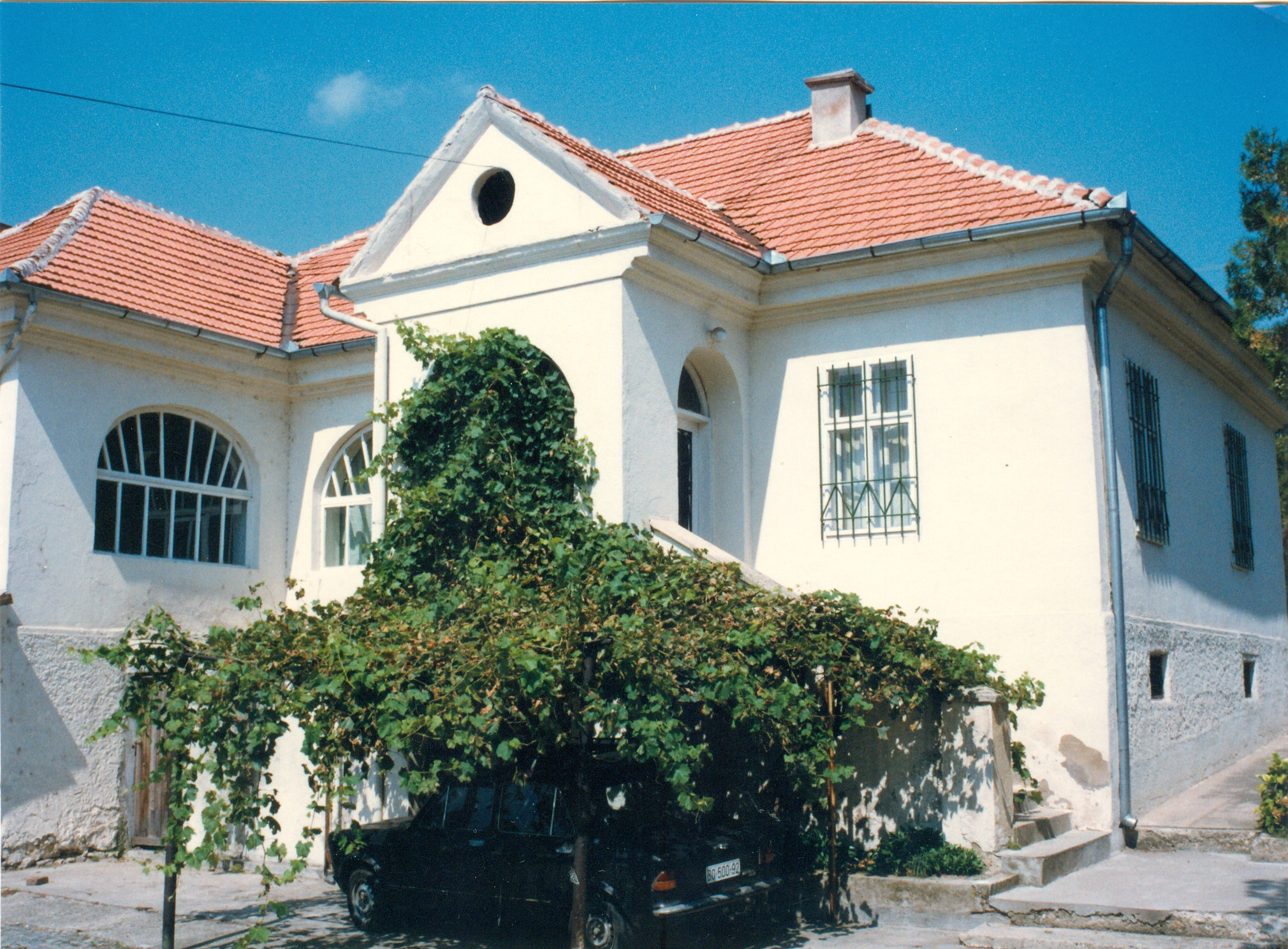

Agency overview
- Formed: 1952; 74 years ago
- Jurisdiction: Government of Serbia
- Headquarters: Branka Perića 13, 19000 Negotin, Serbia
- Parent agency: State Archives of Serbia
- Website: Official website

Map
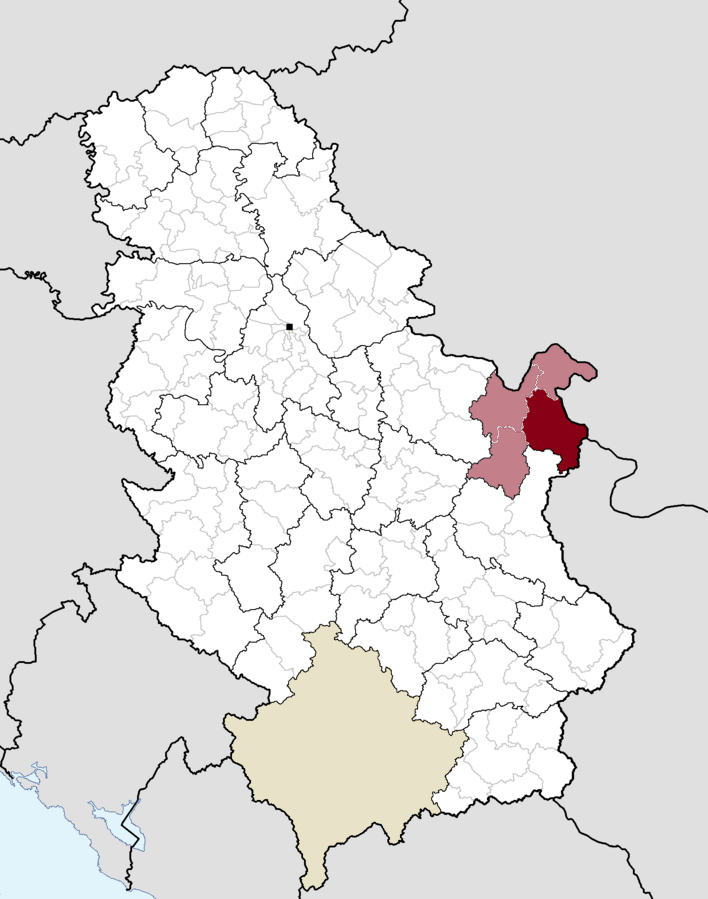
- Area served by the archives shown on the map of Serbia

The Historical Archives of Negotin (Serbian: Историјски архив Неготин) are the primary institution responsible for preservation of archival materials in the Bor District located in Negotin, Serbia. The archives are primarily serving municipalities of Negotin, Kladovo, Majdanpek, and Bor. The Historical Archives in Negotin were established on March 8, 1952, as the City State Archives by the decision of the People's Committee of Negotin and they were renamed several times over the following years. They finally reintroduced the name of the Historical Archives of Negotin in 1996 when they expanded its territorial jurisdiction by incorporating the archival department in Bor.

== See also ==
- List of archives in Serbia
- State Archives of Serbia
