= Historical Archives "Mid-Morava Valley" of Jagodina =

- Историјски архив „Средње Поморавље“-Јагодина (Serbian)

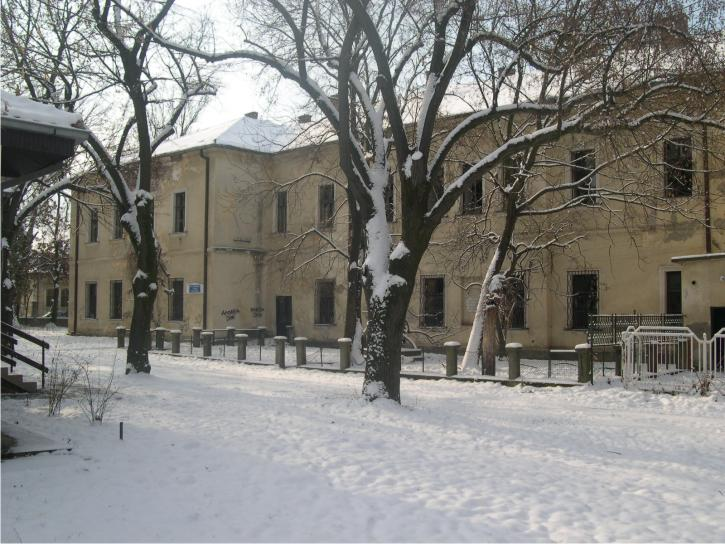
- Building housing the archives

Agency overview
- Formed: 1951; 75 years ago
- Jurisdiction: Government of Serbia
- Headquarters: Jagodina, Serbia
- Parent department: State Archives of Serbia
- Website: Official website

Map
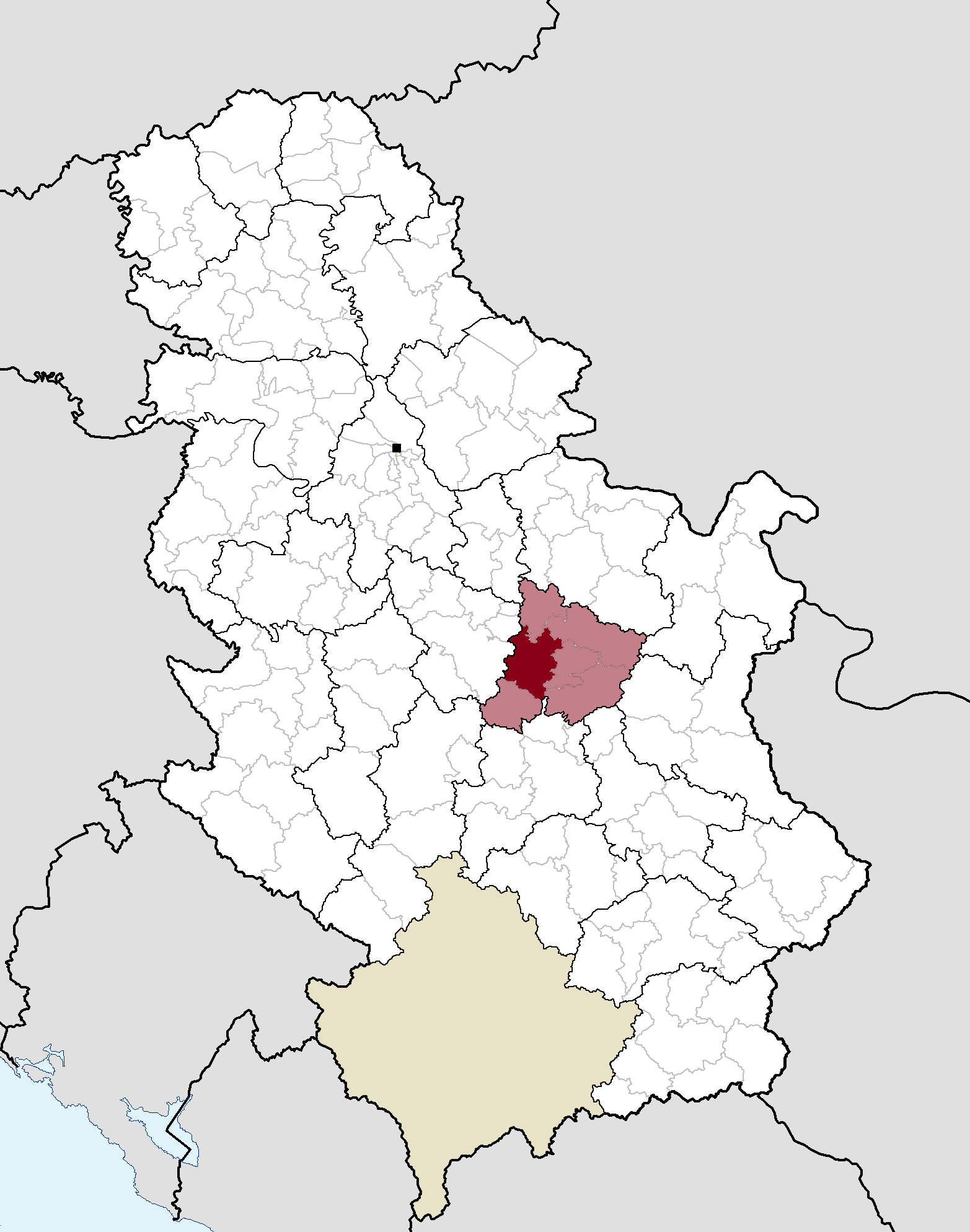
- Area served by the archives shown on the map of Serbia

The Historical Archives "Mid-Morava Valley" of Jagodina (Serbian: Историјски архив „Средње Поморавље“-Јагодина) are the primary institution responsible for preservation of archival materials in northern and central part of the Pomoravlje District located in Jagodina, Serbia. The archives are primarily covering municipalities of Jagodina, Svilajnac, Ćuprija, Paraćin, Rekovac, and Despotovac. The institution was established in 1951 as the State Archives in Svetozarevo. The name of Mid-Morava Valley (Srednje Pomoravlje) was introduced as a part of the official name in 1974. The archives are housed in the building of the old Pedagogical School while the administrative unit was moved to adapted pavilion building in 1975.

== See also ==
- List of archives in Serbia
- State Archives of Serbia
