= Historical Archives "January 31st" of Vranje =

- Историјски архив „31. јануар“ Врање (Serbian)

Agency overview
- Formed: 1962; 64 years ago
- Jurisdiction: Government of Serbia
- Headquarters: Partizanska 17/a, Vranje, Serbia
- Parent agency: State Archives of Serbia
- Website: Official website

Map
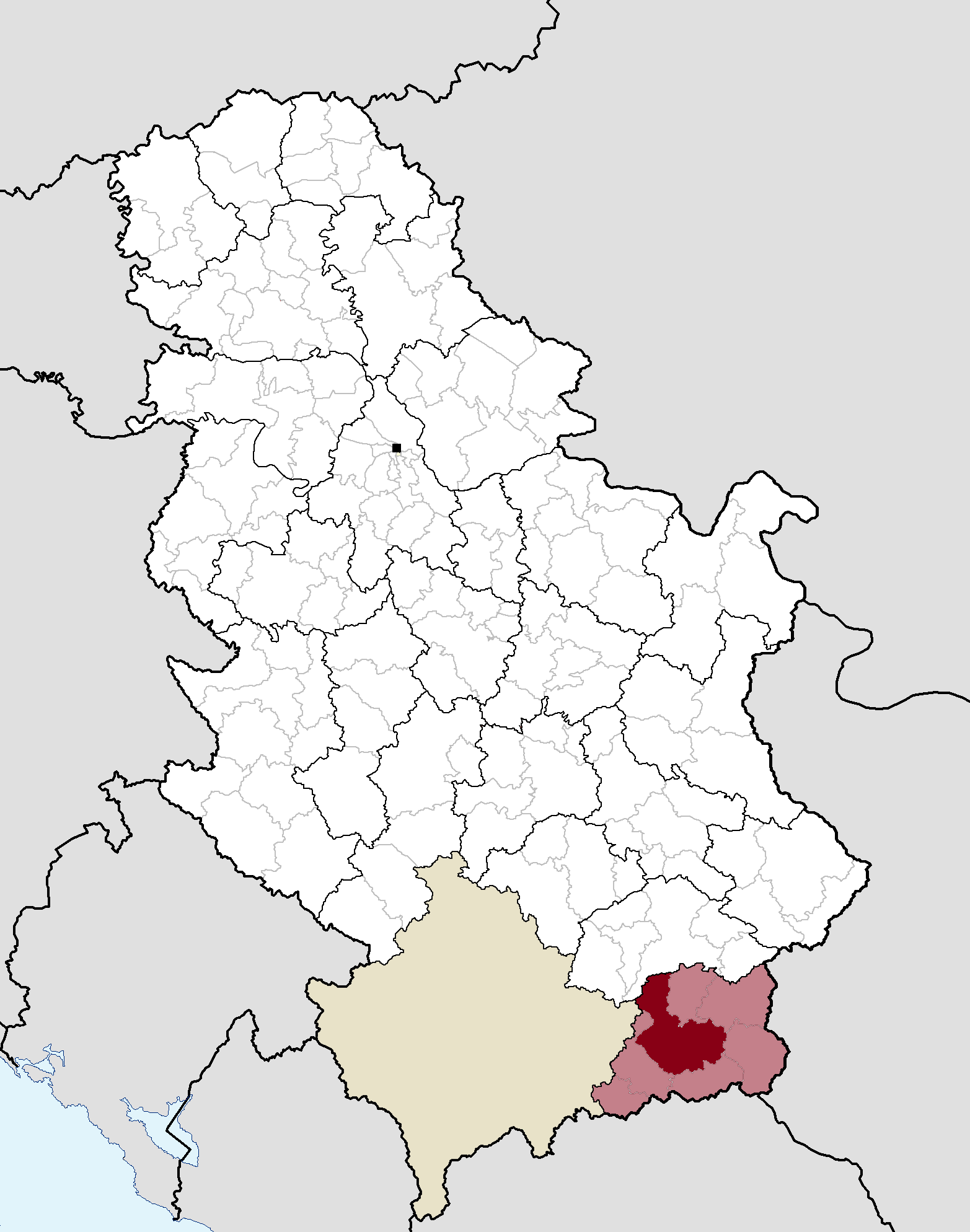
- Area served by the archives shown on the map of Serbia

The Historical Archives "January 31st" of Vranje (Serbian: Историјски архив „31. јануар“ Врање) are the primary institution responsible for preservation of archival materials in the Pčinja District located in Vranje, Serbia. The archives are primarily serving municipalities of Vranje, Vladičin Han, Surdulica, Bosilegrad, Trgovište, Bujanovac, and Preševo. The archives were established in 1962.

== See also ==
- List of archives in Serbia
- State Archives of Serbia
