= Historical Archives of Pirot =

- Историјски архив у Пироту (Serbian)

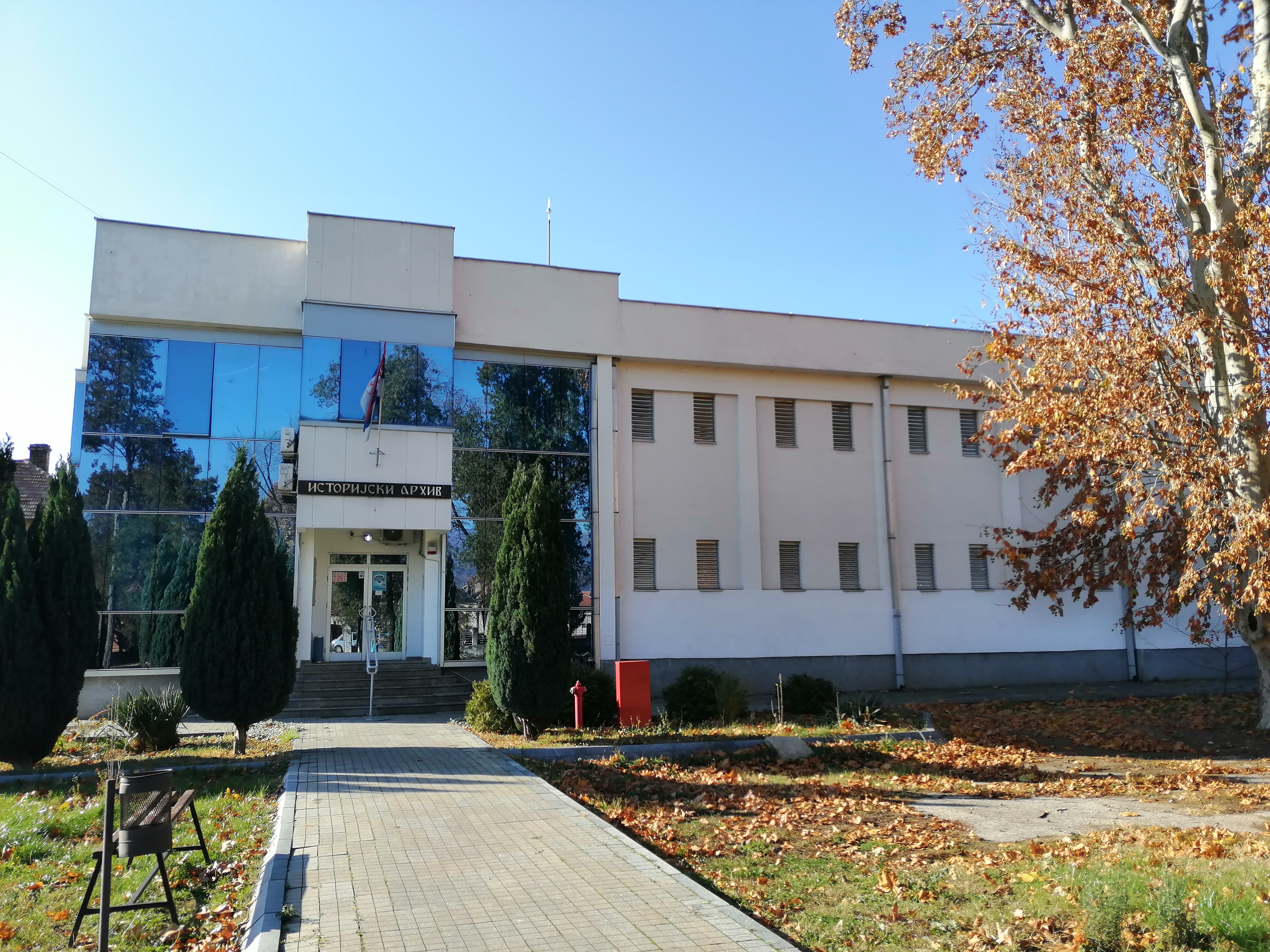

Agency overview
- Formed: 1957; 69 years ago
- Jurisdiction: Government of Serbia
- Headquarters: Srpskih vladara 130, 18300 Pirot, Serbia; 43°09′07″N 22°35′17″E
- Parent agency: State Archives of Serbia
- Website: Official website

Map
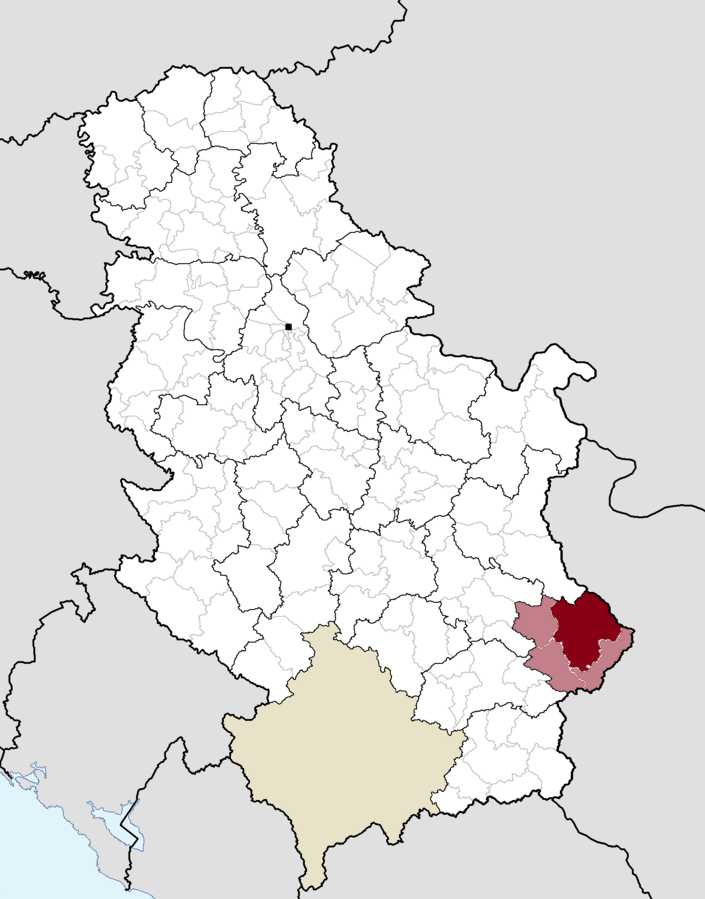
- Area served by the archives shown on the map of Serbia

The Historical Archives of Pirot (Serbian: Историјски архив у Пироту) are the primary institution responsible for preservation of archival materials in the Pirot District located in Pirot, Serbia. The archives are primarily serving municipalities of Pirot, Bela Palanka, Babušnica, and Dimitrovgrad. The archives were established in 1956. In 2021, the archives received the annual Golden Archives prize, the national prize for best archival practices.

== See also ==
- List of archives in Serbia
- State Archives of Serbia
