= Historical Archives of Leskovac =

- Историјски архив Лесковац (Serbian)

Agency overview
- Formed: 1954; 72 years ago
- Jurisdiction: Government of Serbia
- Headquarters: Dr Rade Svilara 25, 16000 Leskovac, Serbia
- Agency executive: Marija Lazarević, Director
- Parent agency: State Archives of Serbia
- Website: Official website

Map
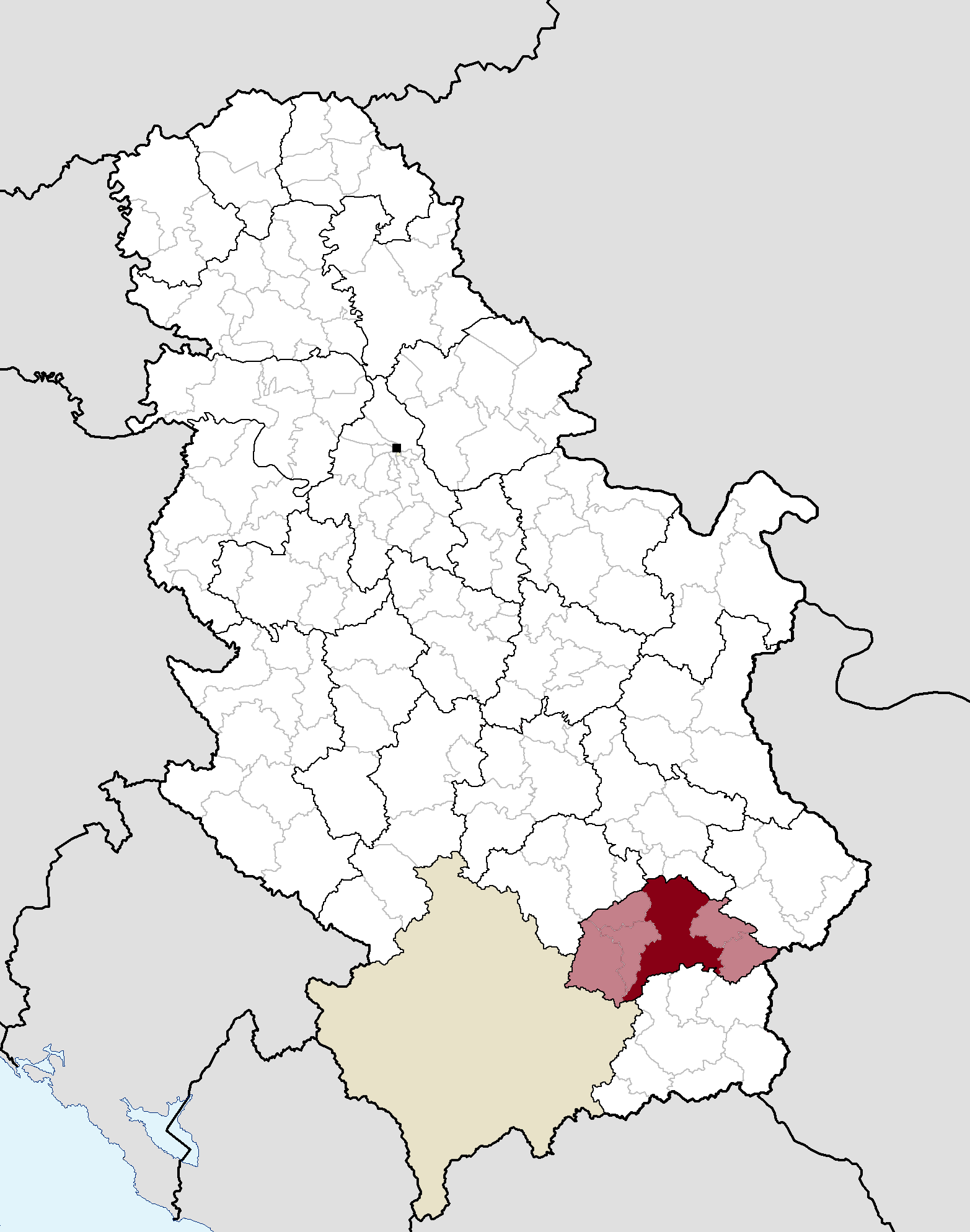
- Area served by the archives shown on the map of Serbia

The Historical Archives of Leskovac (Serbian: Историјски архив Лесковац) are the primary institution responsible for preservation of archival materials in the Jablanica District located in Leskovac, Serbia. The archives are primarily serving municipalities of Leskovac, Vlasotince, Crna Trava, Lebane, Bojnik, and Medveđa. The archives were established in 1954 and their current name was introduced in 1959. Since 1973, the archives are located in the building of the old medical centre. In 2024, the institution got involved in court case in which one employee raised complaint for workplace mobbing against the director.

== See also ==
- List of archives in Serbia
- State Archives of Serbia
