= List of archives in Serbia =

This is a list of archives in Serbia.

== Archives in Serbia ==
=== Archival Network of Serbia ===
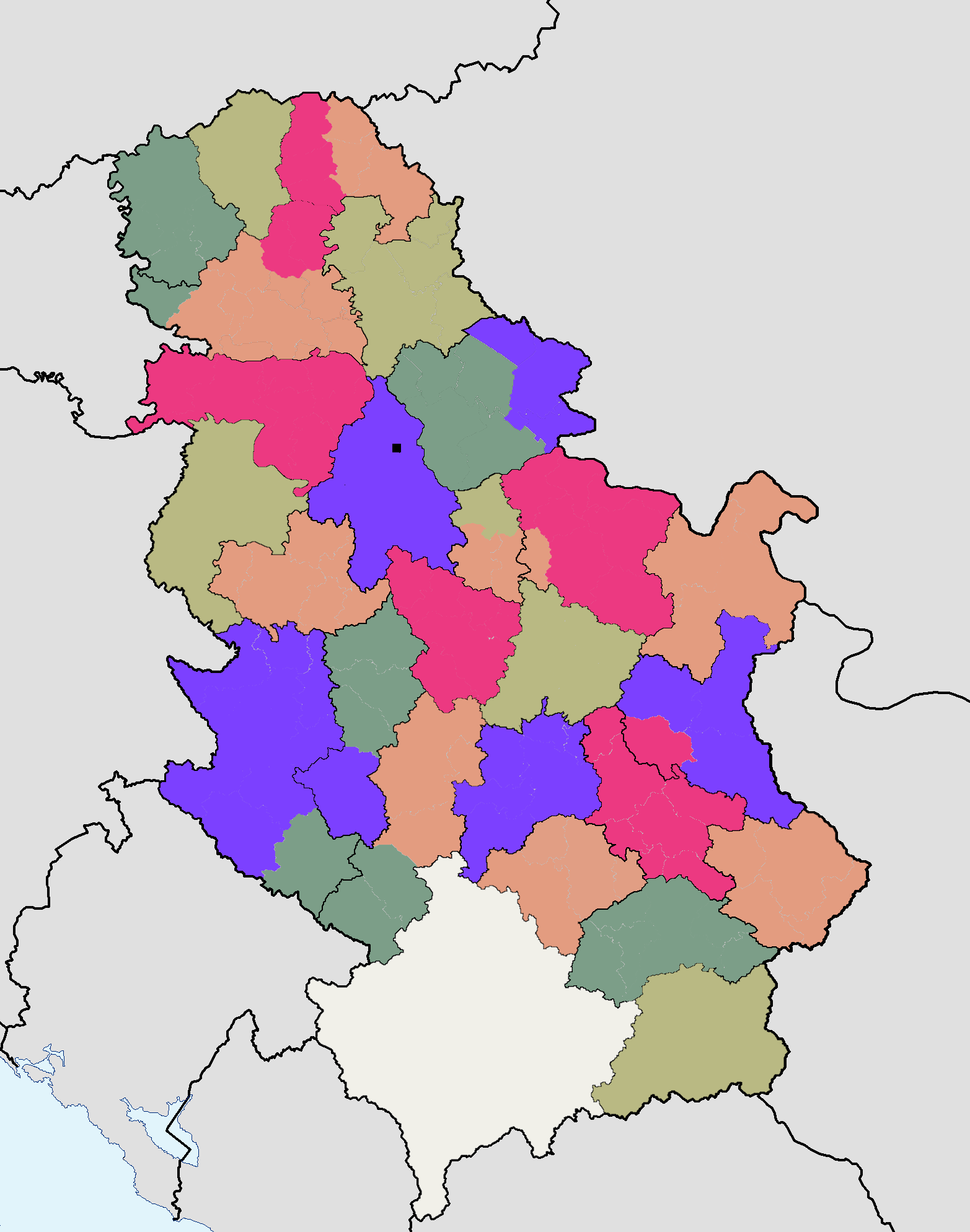
Map of regional public archives in Serbia.

The following archives are a part of the Archival Network of Serbia.

- State Archives of Serbia
- Archives of Vojvodina
- Historical Archives of Bela Crkva
- Historical Archives of Belgrade
- Intermunicipal Historical Archives of Čačak
- Historical Archives "Mid-Morava Valley" of Jagodina
- Historical Archives of Kikinda
- Historical Archives of Šumadija in Kragujevac
- Historical Archives of Kraljevo
- Historical Archives of Kruševac
- Historical Archives of Leskovac
- Historical Archives of Negotin
- Historical Archives of Niš
- Historical Archives "Ras" of Novi Pazar
- Historical Archives of Novi Sad
- Historical Archives of Pančevo
- Historical Archives of Pirot
- Historical Archives of Požarevac
- Historical Archives "Toplica" of Prokuplje
- Historical Archives of Senta
- Historical Archives "Veroslava Veljašević" of Smederevska Palanka
- Historical Archives of Smederevo
- Historical Archives of Sombor
- Historical Archives of Srem
- Historical Archives of Subotica
- Intermunicipal Historical Archives of Šabac
- Historical Archives of Užice
- Historical Archives of Valjevo
- Historical Archives "January 31st" of Vranje
- Historical Archives "Timok Valley" of Zaječar
- Historical Archives of Zrenjanin

=== Other ===
- Diplomatic Archives
- Military Archives
- Yugoslav Film Archive
- Archives of Yugoslavia
- Archives of the Serbian Orthodox Church
- Serbian Academy of Sciences and Arts Archives in Belgrade
- Archives of Sremski Karlovci

== See also ==
- List of archives
- List of libraries in Serbia
- List of museums in Serbia
- Culture of Serbia
- Archives of Republika Srpska
- Archives of Serbs in Croatia
- Archives of the Eparchy of Buda
