= Intermunicipal Historical Archives of Čačak =

Archive in Čačak, Serbia

- Међуопштински историјски архив Чачак (Serbian)

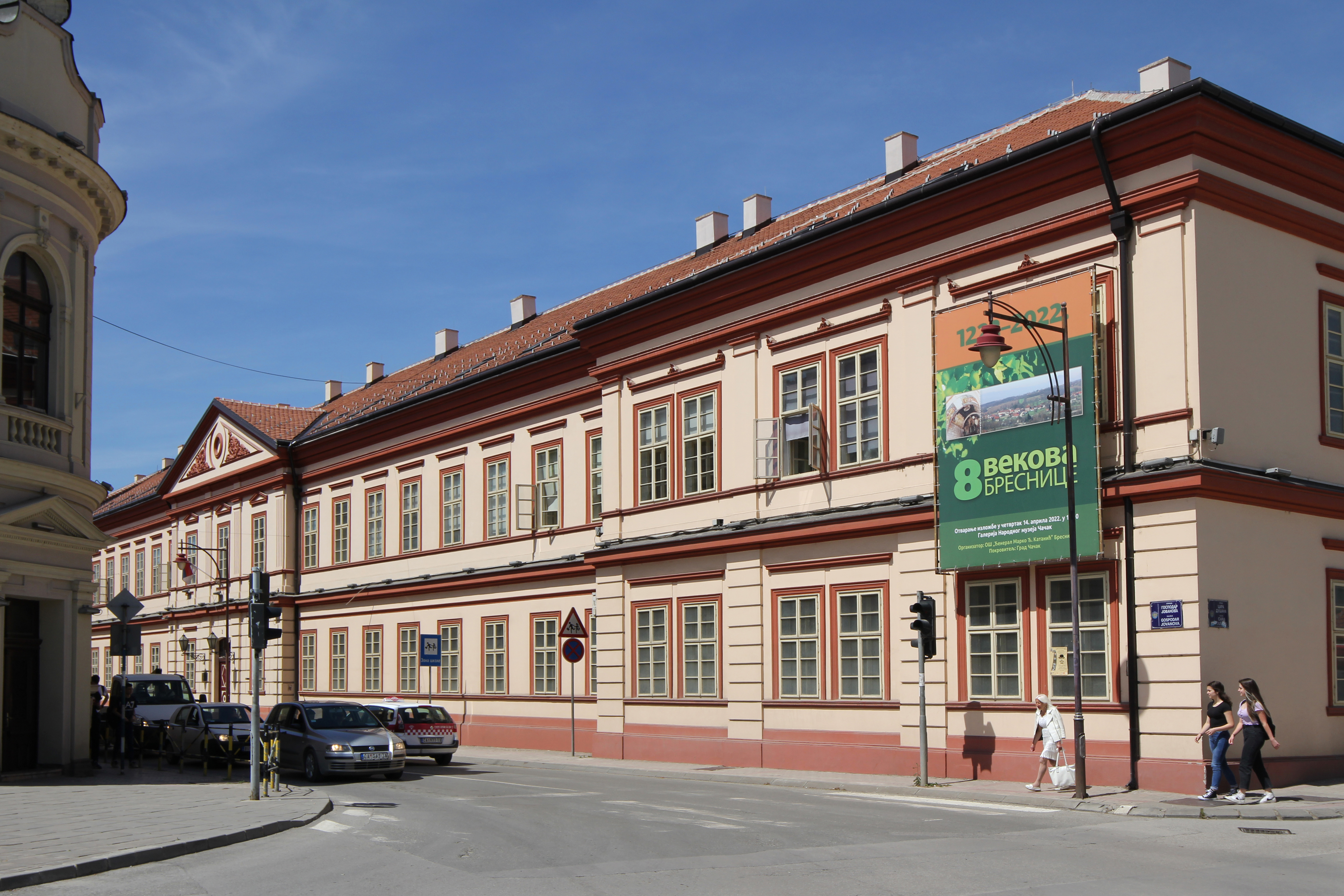
- Budilding housing the archives

Agency overview
- Formed: 1948; 78 years ago
- Jurisdiction: Government of Serbia
- Headquarters: Gospodar Jovanova 2, Čačak, Serbia
- Parent agency: State Archives of Serbia
- Website: Official website

Map
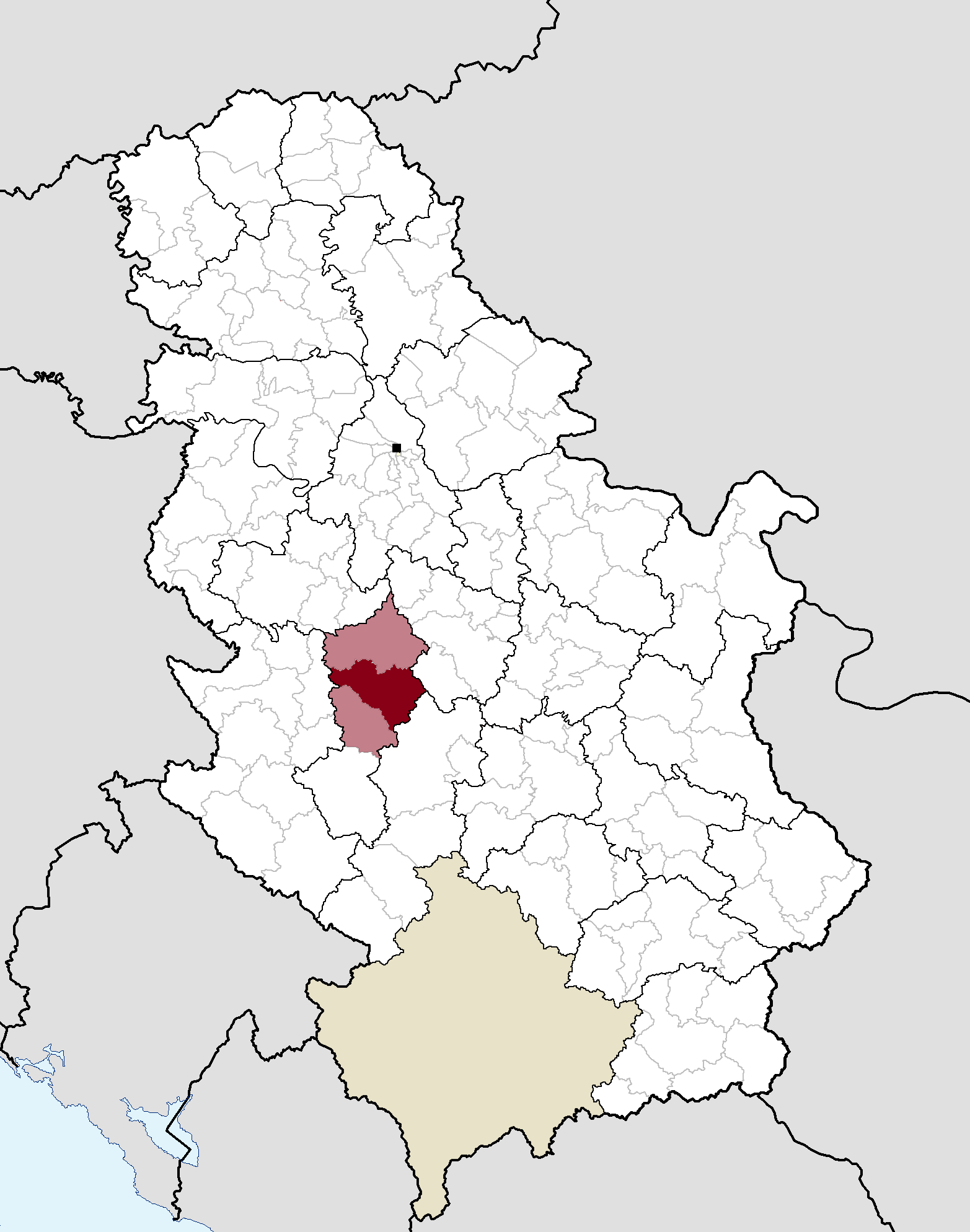
- Area served by the archive shown on the map of Serbia

The Intermunicipal Historical Archives of Čačak (Serbian: Међуопштински историјски архив Чачак) are the primary institution responsible for preservation of archival materials in the Moravica District located in Čačak, Serbia. The archives are primarily covering municipalities of Čačak, Gornji Milanovac, and Lučani. The archives hold a total of 561 fonds, of which 21 are of exceptional importance, and 60 fonds have been declared cultural treasures of significant importance. Since 1968, the archive is housed in the same building with the Museum in Čačak.

== See also ==
- List of archives in Serbia
- State Archives of Serbia
