= Historical Archives of Šumadija in Kragujevac =

- Историјски архив Шумадије (Serbian)

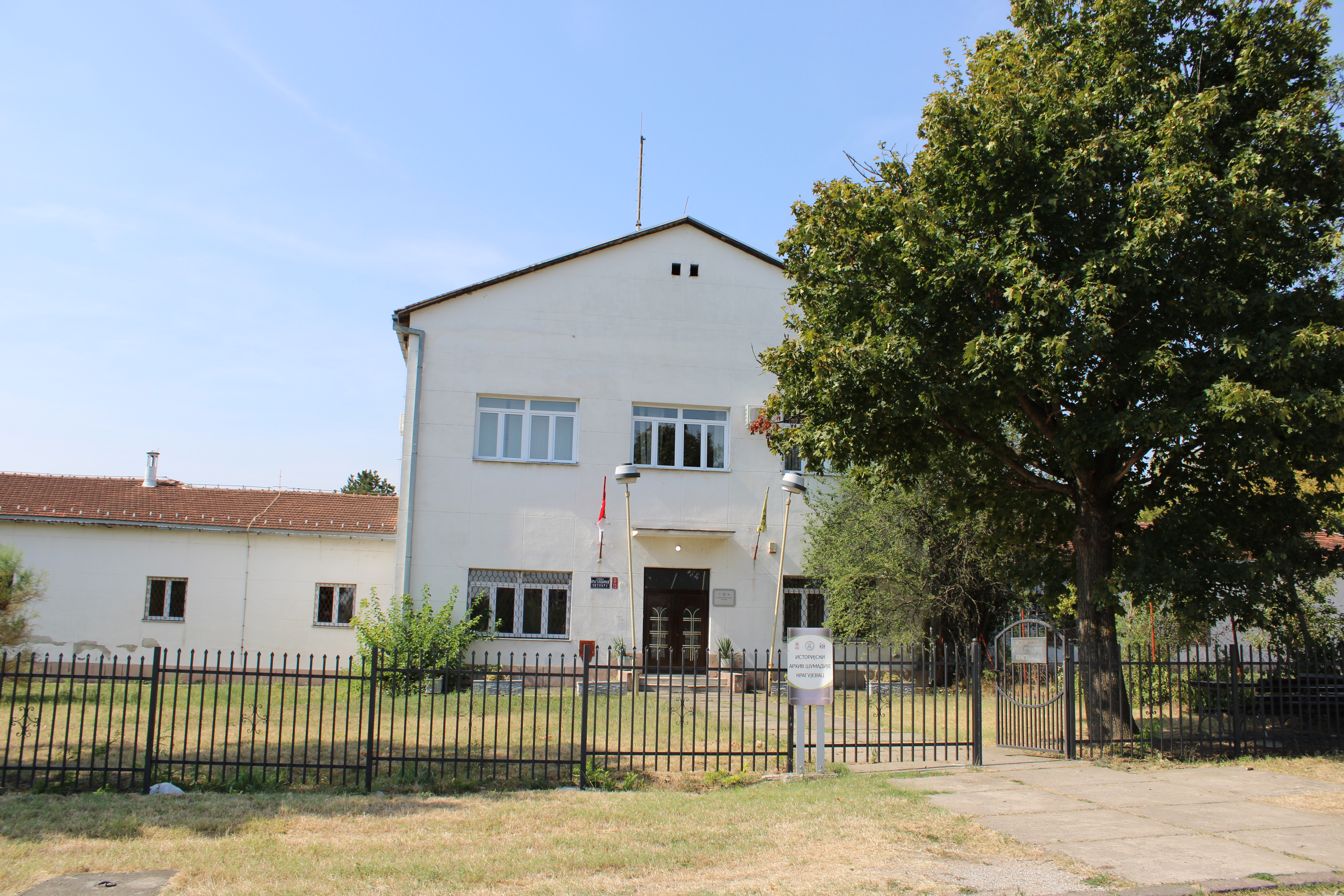

Agency overview
- Formed: 1948; 78 years ago
- Jurisdiction: Government of Serbia
- Headquarters: Kragujevačkog oktobra 13, Kragujevac, Serbia; 44°01′11″N 20°53′48″E
- Parent agency: State Archives of Serbia
- Website: Official website

Map
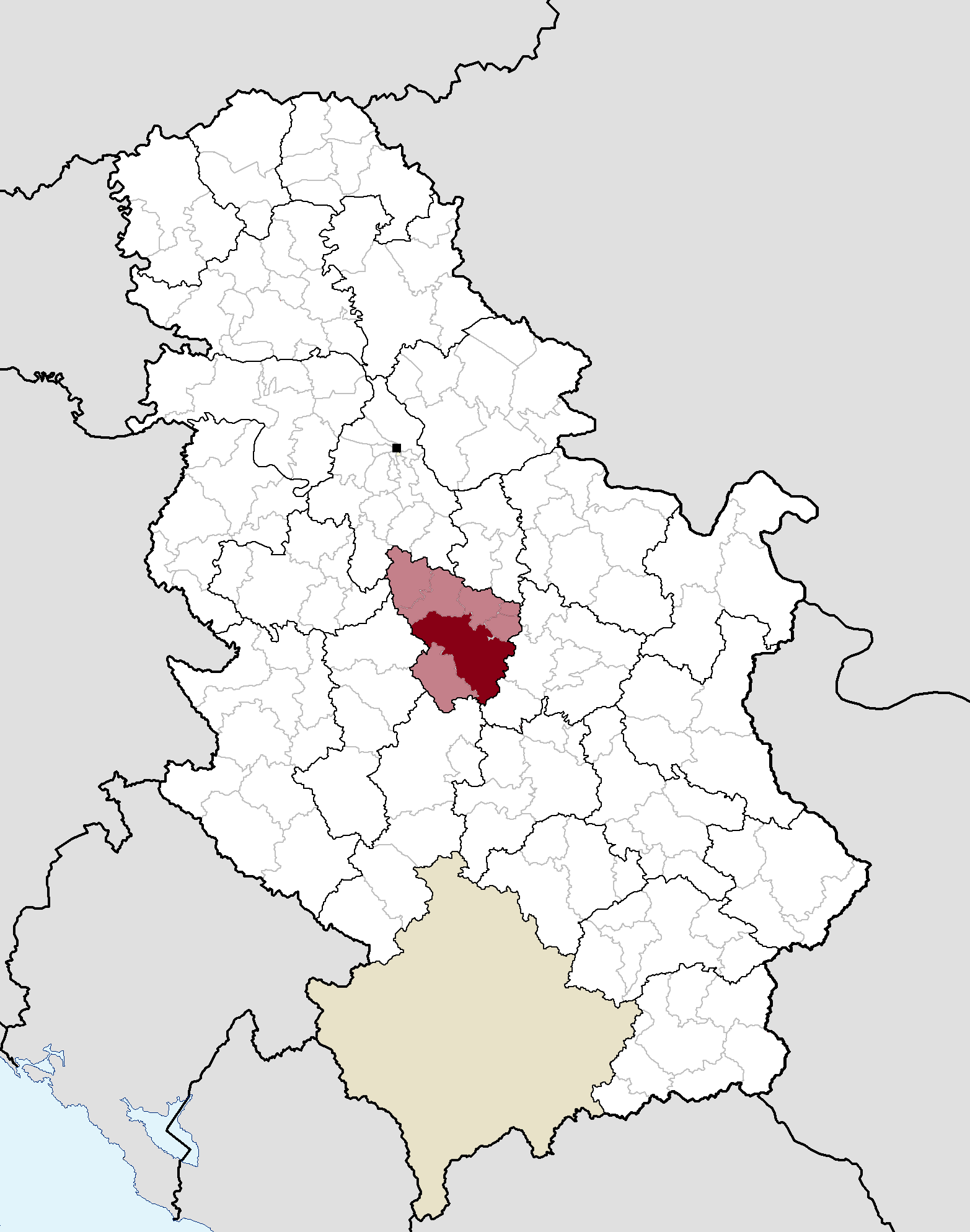
- Area served by the archives shown on the map of Serbia

The Historical Archives of Šumadija in Kragujevac (Serbian: Историјски архив Шумадије - Крагујевац) are the primary institution responsible for preservation of archival materials in the Šumadija District located in Kragujevac, Serbia. The archives are primarily covering municipalities of Kragujevac, Rača, Batočina, Knić, Topola, Aranđelovac, and Lapovo. The archives in Kragujevac notably preserve some of the documents from the pre-independence Ottoman Serbia period as well as socialist era business archives of the large industrial factories from the city and the region.

== History ==
In 1948 the archival centre in Kragujevac was established with the mission of collecting documentation from pre-World War II institutions that had been closed down. Following changes in Yugoslav and Serbian regulations the archival centre in Kragujevac was transformed into the City Public Archives in 1952. Initially, the archive covered significantly larger area including the city of Kraljevo and Novi Pazar and surrounding municipalities. The archives were renamed once again in 1958 when they were named the State Archives of the Kragujevac District which remained the official name until 1967 when the new name of the Historical Archives of Kragujevac was introduced. Finally, the current name of the institution was introduced in 1970. During the 1999 NATO bombing of Yugoslavia, the archives building suffered severe damage, and part of the archival material was harmed. The relocation of the most significant fonds to another location caused irreparable damage.

== See also ==
- List of archives in Serbia
- State Archives of Serbia
