= Intermunicipal Historical Archives of Šabac =

- Међуопштински историјски архив Шабац (Serbian)
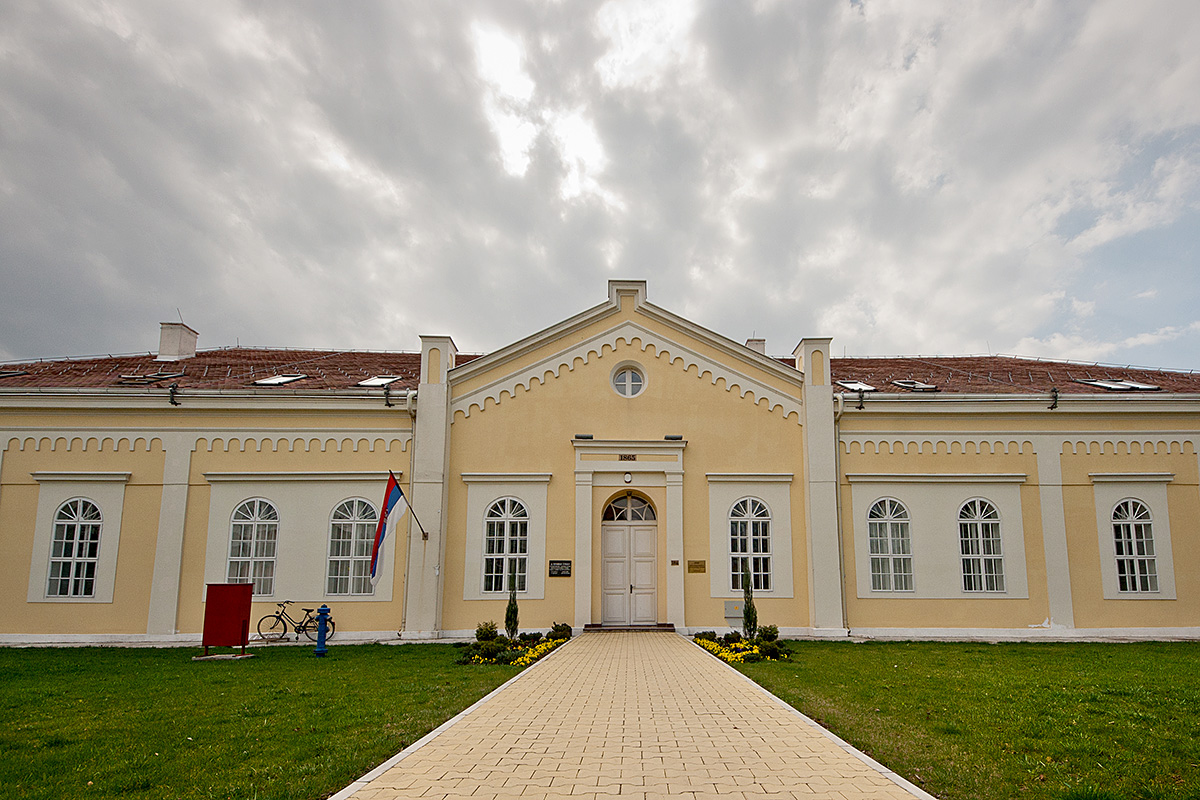

Agency overview
- Formed: 1952; 74 years ago
- Jurisdiction: Government of Serbia
- Headquarters: Vojvode Mišića 18a, 15000 Šabac, Serbia
- Parent agency: State Archives of Serbia
- Website: Official website

Map
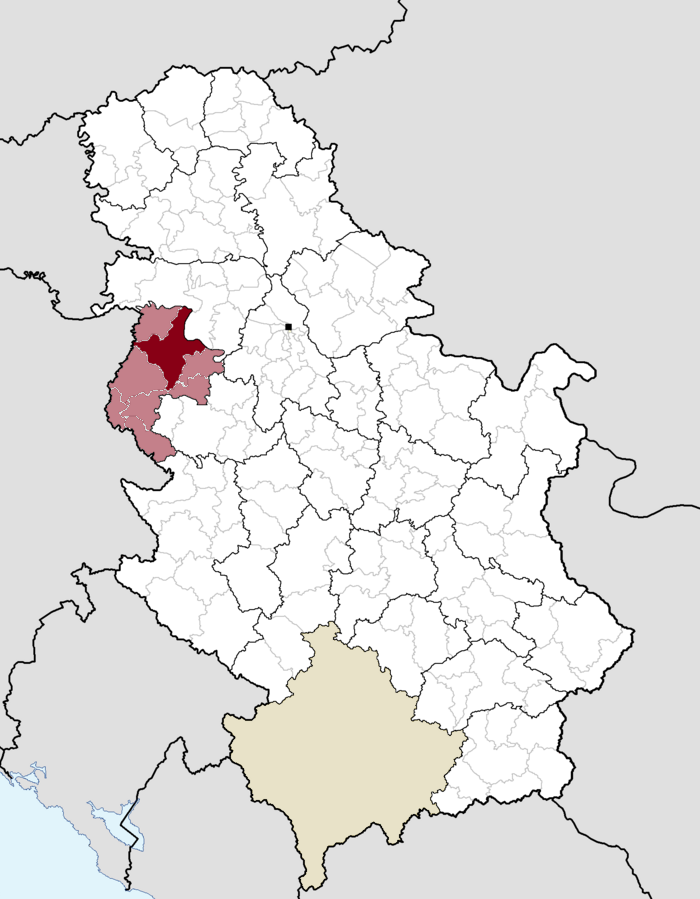
- Area served by the archives shown on the map of Serbia

The Intermunicipal Historical Archives of Šabac (Serbian: Међуопштински историјски архив Шабац) are the primary institution responsible for preservation of archival materials in the Mačva District located in Šabac, Serbia. The archives are primarily serving municipalities of Šabac, Bogatić, Vladimirci, Koceljeva, Ljubovija, Mali Zvornik, Loznica, and Krupanj.

== Background ==
The Intermunicipal Historical Archives in Šabac were established by the decision of the City People's Committee of Šabac on January 11, 1952. The archives process, organize, and publish materials from a total of 517 collections and funds, covering the period from the early 19th century to the present. Among their holdings are 30 collections of exceptional importance and 33 collections of great significance.

== See also ==
- List of archives in Serbia
- State Archives of Serbia
