= Historical Archives of Valjevo =

- Историјски архив Ваљево (Serbian)

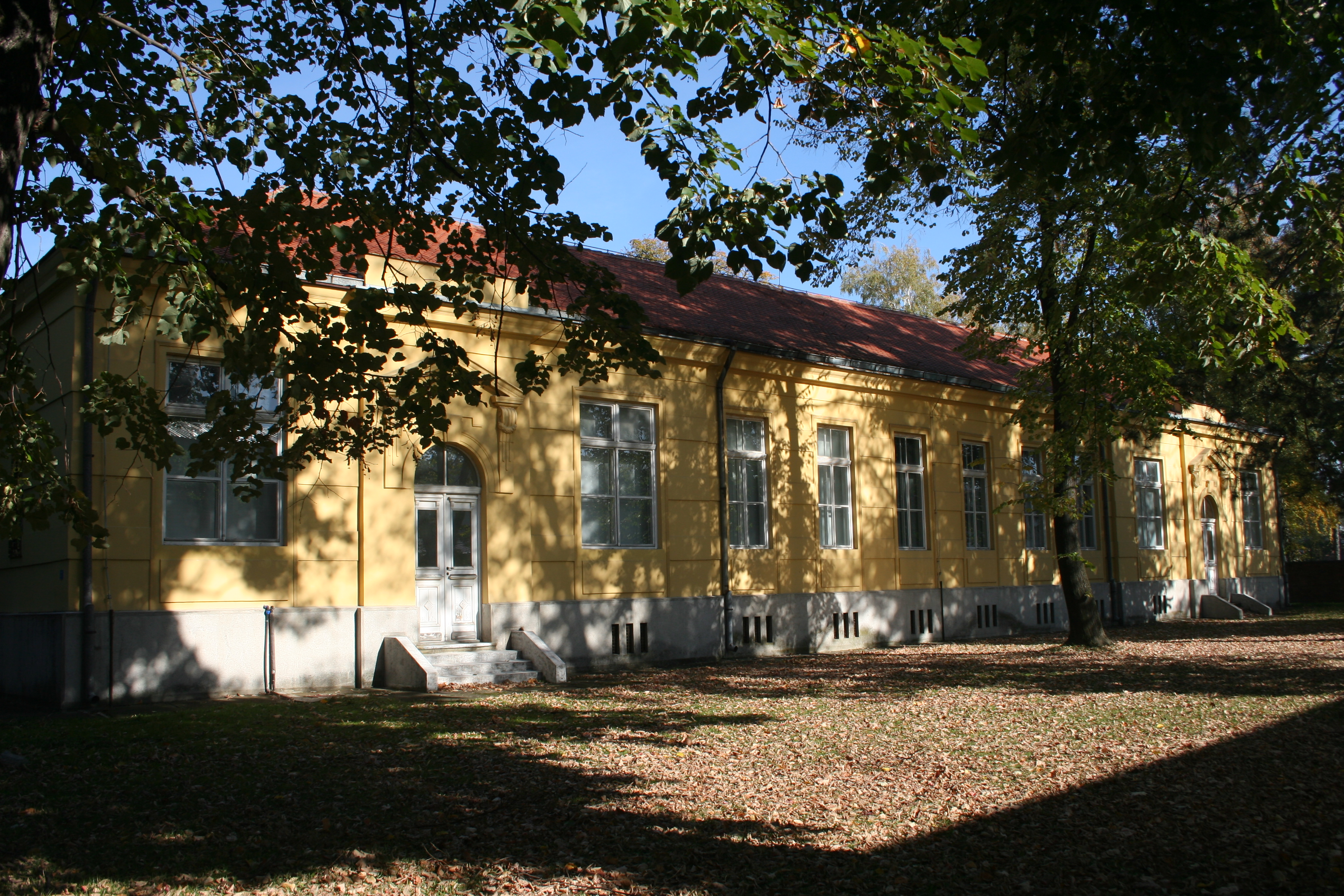

Agency overview
- Formed: 1948; 78 years ago
- Jurisdiction: Government of Serbia
- Headquarters: Valjevo, Serbia
- Parent agency: State Archives of Serbia
- Website: Official website

Map
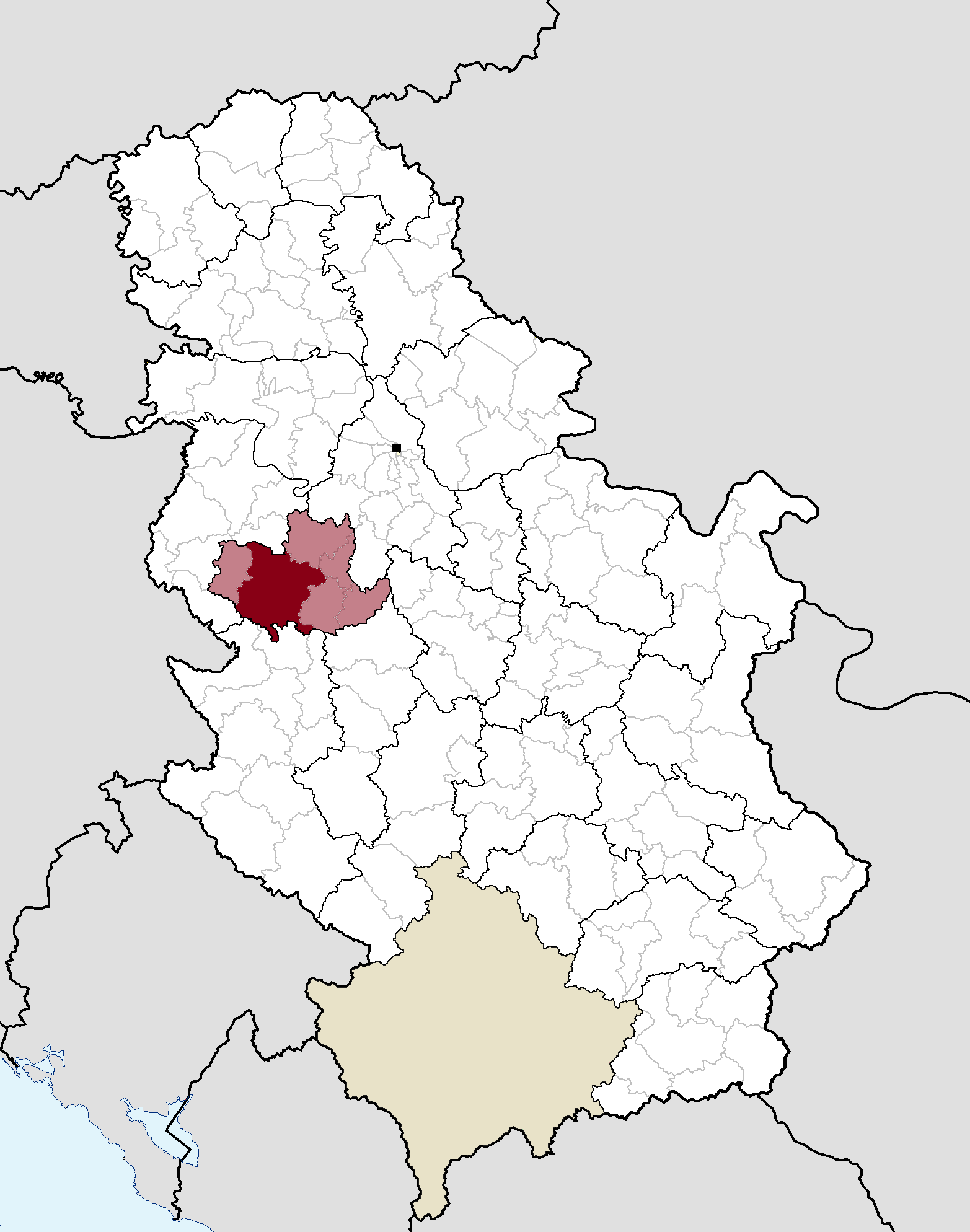
- Area served by the archives shown on the map of Serbia

The Historical Archives of Valjevo (Serbian: Историјски архив Ваљево) are the primary institution responsible for preservation of archival materials in the Kolubara District located in Valjevo, Serbia. The archive are primarily serving municipalities of Valjevo, Ub, Osečina, Mionica, Lajkovac, and Ljig. The archival centre in the city of Valjevo was established in 1948 as one of six new centres of that kind in Serbia at the time. The building housing the archives was completed in 1907 and at the time it served as one of the buildings of the local hospital.

== See also ==
- List of archives in Serbia
- State Archives of Serbia
