= Archives of Republika Srpska =

- Архив Републике Српске; Arhiv Republike Srpske

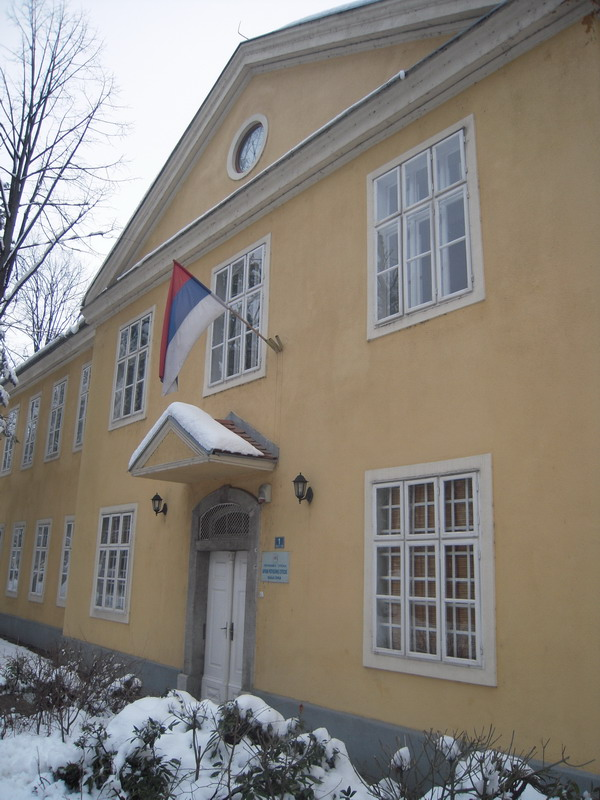
- Archives of Republika Srpska headquarters in Banja Luka

National archives overview
- Formed: September 11, 1993
- Preceding agencies: Banja Luka City Archives (1953–1956); Banja Luka District Archives (1956–1963); Archives of Bosanska Krajina (1963–1993)
- Jurisdiction: Republika Srpska
- Headquarters: Banja Luka, Aleja Svetog Save 1; 44.77461°N 17.19402°E
- Employees: 32
- Annual budget: BAM 859,800 (€439,620) (2015)
- National archives executive: Bojan Stojnić, Director
- Parent department: Ministry of Education and Culture of Republika Srpska
- Website: www.arhivrs.org

The Archives of Republika Srpska (Serbo-Croatian: Архив Републике Српске, Arhiv Republike Srpske) is an administrative organisation within the Ministry of Education and Culture of Republika Srpska, one of two constituent entities of Bosnia and Herzegovina. The Archives' headquarters is in Banja Luka, and it has its regional offices in Doboj, Zvornik, Foča, Sokolac, and Trebinje. Its aim is to collect, store, preserve, organise, research, and provide access to archival materials on the territory of Republika Srpska, where it is designated as a central institution for the protection of cultural heritage. The Archives is also involved in research projects, exhibitions, and in the publishing of books and scholarly papers, mostly in the fields of archival science, history, and law. It is organised into two sectors, which are responsible for the protection of archival materials within and outside the Archives, respectively. The Archives currently holds 794 fonds and 35 collections, which span the period from the 17th century to the modern day.

== Mission and activities ==
The work of the Archives of Republika Srpska comprises professional archival, cultural, administrative, research and service activities. It is regulated by the Law on Archival Activity (Zakon o arhivskoj djelatnosti) passed by the National Assembly of Republika Srpska, as well as by regulations and instructions issued by the Ministry of Education and Culture of the Government of Republika Srpska. According to the law, the Archives' mission is to collect, sort, process, research, preserve and protect public documentary and archival materials, as well as to publish and provide access to them. In this way, one of the tasks of the Archives is to protect both the interests of Republika Srpska and the personal rights of its individual citizens. The documentary and archival materials that the Archives collects come from legislative, executive, and judicial branches of government, public institutions, business organisations, civic associations, and other legal entities, as well as individuals, whose work and actions are considered to be of lasting importance for Republika Srpska in social, cultural, scientific, legal, and other matters. The sources of the materials are called the creators and owners of archival materials, and they are divided into three groups regarding their importance for the society of Republika Srpska within their respective fields of activity. The Archives is entitled to supervise the protection of archival materials while they are still kept by their creators and owners, before their ultimate transfer to the Archives.

The Archives is involved in research projects and in the publishing of books and scholarly papers, mostly in the fields of archival science, history, and law. Its publishing activities are mostly realised through the Association of Archivists of Republika Srpska, which also organises seminars for registry employees. The Archives cooperates with related institutions in other countries, and it has signed agreements on cooperation with the Archives of Serbia, Archives of Yugoslavia, Croatian State Archives, State Archives of the Republic of Macedonia, Budapest City Archives, International Institute for Archival Science of Trieste and Maribor, and a number of regional archives in Serbia. This cooperation is primarily reflected in exchanges of exhibitions of archival materials. As part of marking the First World War centenary in 2014, the Archives of Republika Srpska prepared the exhibition Young Bosnia and the Sarajevo Assassination, which toured Belgrade and other cities in Serbia, as well as Skopje in Macedonia. The Archives is designated as a central institution for the protection of the cultural heritage of Republika Srpska, along with the institutions such as the National and University Library of Republika Srpska and the Museum of Modern Art of Republika Srpska.

== Organisation and facilities ==
The Archives of Republika Srpska is an administrative organisation within the Ministry of Education and Culture of the Government of Republika Srpska. Its headquarters is situated in Banja Luka, and it has its regional offices in Doboj, Zvornik, Foča, Sokolac, and Trebinje. It is organised into two sectors, each of which consists of two departments:

Archives of Republika Srpska
Sector for the Protection of Archival Materials within the Archives	Sector for the Protection of Archival Materials outside the Archives and Legal and General Affairs
Department for Classifying and Processing of Archival Materials	Department for the Protection of Archival Materials outside the Archives
Department for Researching	Department for Legal and General Affairs

The Archives is managed by the director, and the sectors are run by the assistant directors. The activities of the department for classifying and processing and the department for the protection of archival materials outside the Archives are carried out on a territorial basis. In this respect, the territory of Republika Srpska is divided into six regions, one of which is under the jurisdiction of the Archives' headquarters, and the others are under the jurisdiction of the corresponding regional offices.

The premises of the Archives occupy 2,774 square metres (29,860 square feet) in total, 1,550 square metres (16,700 square feet) of which are used for the depots for storing archival materials. The main building of the Archives, where its headquarters is also located, is known in Banja Luka as Carska kuća, or Imperial House. It was built shortly after Austria-Hungary's occupation of Bosnia and Herzegovina in 1878 to serve the empire's military purposes. It measures 58.2 metres (191 feet) by 13.8 metres (45 feet) and contains two floors, but it lacks a basement. The building was thoroughly repaired between 2003 and 2006. It was then provided with equipment for restoration and preservation of archival materials and bindery equipment, bought through donations of the Government of Japan. Carska kuća has been in continuous public use longer than any other structure in Banja Luka. The Archives' regional offices have much weaker capacities for proper storing of archival materials. As of 2013, the Archives has 32 employees, 18 of whom have academic degrees; 22 employees work in Banja Luka, three in Zvornik, two in Foča, two in Sokolac, two in Trebinje, and one employee works in Doboj.

== Holdings ==
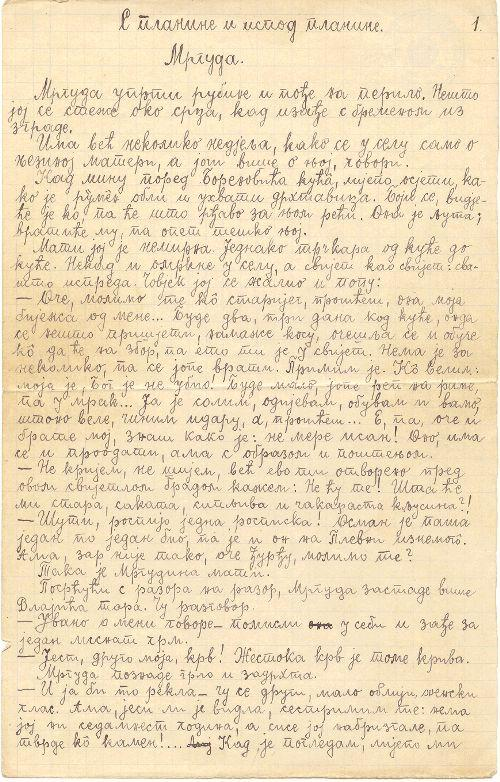
Part of the original manuscript of a short story by Petar Kočić (1902), kept in the Archives of Republika Srpska

As of 2015, the Archives of Republika Srpska holds 794 fonds and 35 collections. Out of these, 502 fonds and 25 collections are kept in Banja Luka, 120 fonds and 8 collections in Doboj, 94 fonds in Foča, 53 fonds and 2 collections in Trebinje, and 25 fonds in Zvornik. The archival materials span the period from the 17th century to the modern day. The Collection of Oriental Manuscripts and Documents is the oldest holding, and it includes documents from the period of Ottoman rule over Bosnia and Herzegovina written in Ottoman Turkish. The oldest fonds originated during Austria-Hungary's rule over Bosnia and Herzegovina. Later fonds come from the periods of the Kingdom of Yugoslavia (1918–1941) and World War II, while most fonds cover the period of Socialist Yugoslavia (1945–1991). Nearly half of the fonds come from government bodies and public services. Others come from economy and banking; political organisations and citizens' associations; educational, scientific and cultural institutions; judiciary; social and health services; personal and family legacies; military bodies and institutions; and religious organisation. The library of the Archives of Republika Srpska contains more than 20,000 items of books and periodicals, including old publications from Austria-Hungary and the Kingdom of Yugoslavia.

Twenty-four fonds and collections of the Archives of Republika Srpska were proclaimed National Monuments of Bosnia and Herzegovina in 2007. These include the documentation of the Banja Luka District from 1878 to 1918, during Austria-Hungary's rule, and from 1919 to 1922, during the Kingdom of Serbs, Croats, and Slovenes (renamed Yugoslavia in 1929). Also included is the documentation of the Banja Luka oblast (1922–1929) and the Vrbas Banate (1929–1941). Four fonds contain various documents of the Independent State of Croatia, a Nazi puppet state that existed during World War II in Yugoslavia (1941–1945). Nine fonds contain documents produced by commissions set up by the new Yugoslav authorities between 1944 and 1946 to investigate war crimes committed by the occupying forces and their domestic collaborators during World War II. Connected to the war is also the Collection of Documents of the Central Bosnia Chetnik Corps from 1943 to 1945. Documents of the Banja Luka District Court from 1878 to 1945 and of the Banja Luka Tobacco Factory from 1888 to the present day are gathered in their respective fonds. Documents produced between 1946 and 1957 by agrarian commissions in the Banja Luka District are merged into a single fonds. Included in the National Monument are also the Collection of Oriental Manuscripts and Documents from the 17th to the 20th Century, the Collection of Charts and Maps since 1807, and the Collection of Works by Veselin Masleša from 1928 to 1943 (including Masleša's original manuscripts).

== History ==
I think that, in our circumstances, one should always underline and stress everywhere the fact that the archives are not some dead tracks or passive positions in our social and cultural life, and that carelessness toward archival materials is a cultural disgrace and a national damage.

— ~ Ivo Andrić, 1960.

The first archival institution in north-western Bosnia was established on 20 April 1953 as the Banja Luka City Archives. Previously, old documentary and archival materials were housed in museums and libraries. The Archives was founded by the People's Committee of Banja Luka; units of local government in Socialist Yugoslavia were then called people's committees. It was situated in the basement of the committee's headquarters (today used by the Banja Luka City Administration); it had two employees. Its jurisdiction was officially expanded on 30 May 1956, when it became the Banja Luka District Archives, responsible also for the Prijedor District. In 1958, a room at the local community office in Nova Topola was enabled to store archival materials collected in the Gradiška District. In 1963, the district assemblies of Banja Luka and Bihać decided to establish the Archives of Bosanska Krajina, the jurisdiction of which included 23 municipalities of the region of Bosanska Krajina; its headquarters remained in Banja Luka. It was the largest regional archives in Yugoslavia's federal unit of Bosnia and Herzegovina. Soon after its establishment, the holdings of the Archives of Bosanska Krajina consisted of around 250 fonds and 9 collections from the Ottoman, Austro-Hungarian, World War II, and post-war periods. Beside the archival collection centre in Nova Topla, such centres were also formed between 1963 and 1964 in Prijedor, Jajce, and Bihać. The Archives' storage facilities in Banja Luka were adversely affected by the destructive earthquake that struck the city on 27 October 1969. In 1973, the Archives was moved to the repaired Carska kuća building, where it is today. The archival collection centres in Bihać, Prijedor, and Jajce were abolished between 1981 and 1983.

Soon after the outbreak of the Bosnian War, the government of the Serbian Republic of Bosnia and Herzegovina (Srpska Republika Bosna i Hercegovina; renamed as Republika Srpska in August 1992) decided on 31 May 1992 to establish the Archives of the Serbian Republic of Bosnia and Herzegovina. It was to be a state-owned public institution with its headquarters in Sarajevo. On 15 September 1992, the National Assembly of Republika Srpska decided that the Archives of Republika Srpska be an administrative organisation of the republic. However, the decision on the establishment of the Archives with its headquarters in Sarajevo was never realised, and the archival activities in Republika Srpska continued to be carried out by the Archives of Bosanska Krajina and the regional archives of Doboj and Foča. The Law on Ministries passed by the National Assembly of Republika Srpska on 11 September 1993 defined the Archives of Republika Srpska as an administrative organisation of the republic responsible for the archival activities on its territory, headquartered in Banja Luka and with its regional offices in Doboj and Foča. The new archival legislation augmented the one passed in 1987. The first director of the Archives of Republika Srpska was Nebojša Radmanović. During the war, the Archives organised two exhibitions and provided continuous services to students and researchers. Fifty-three researchers used the Archives in 1995, the last year of the war. At that time, it had 18 employees. The Archives was later placed under the Ministry of Education and Culture of the Government of Republika Srpska. The Archives' regional offices in Zvornik and Trebinje were established in 2001, and its regional office in Sokolac was established in 2008.
