= Historical Archives of Niš =

- Историјски архив Ниш (Serbian)
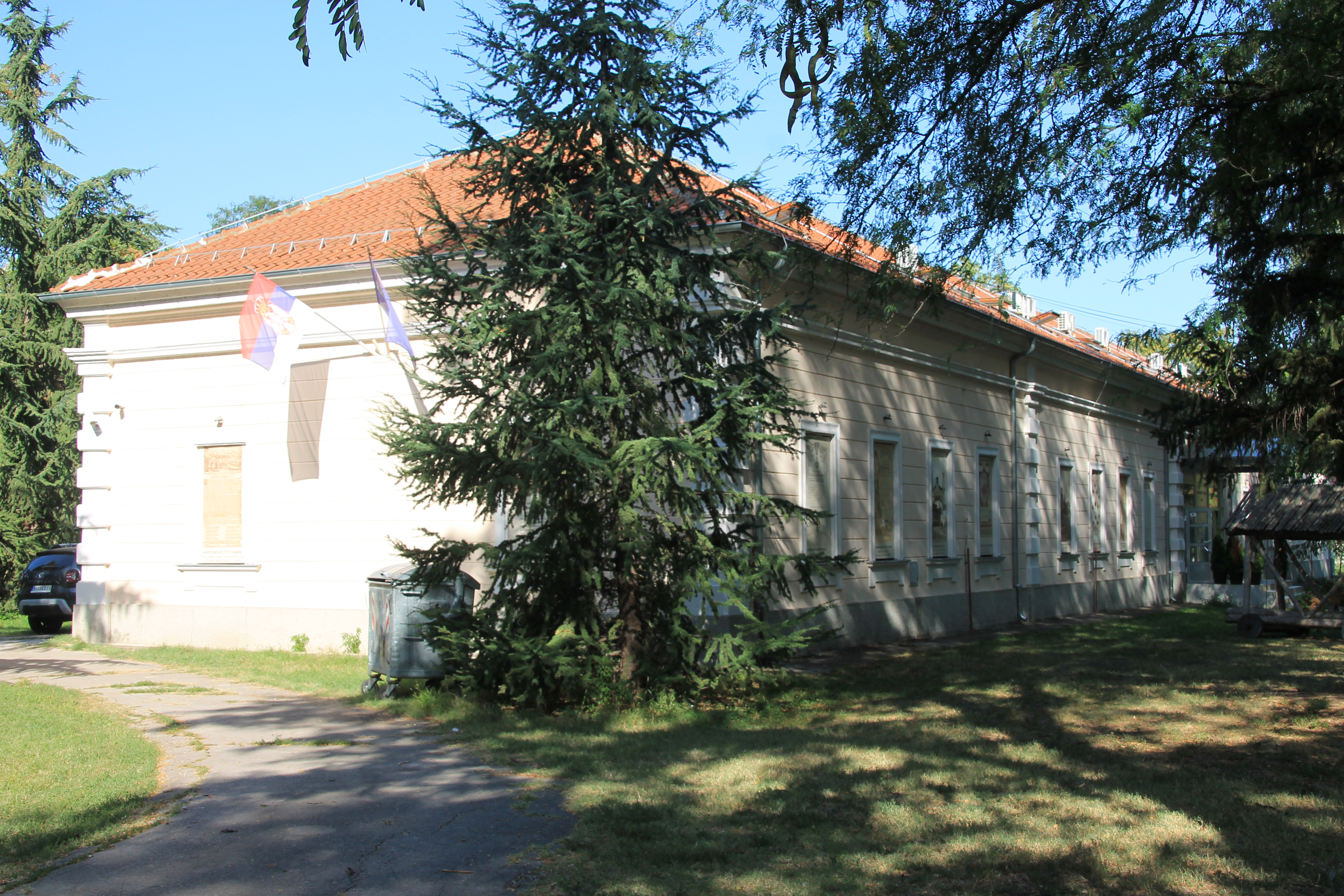
- Building housing the archives

Agency overview
- Formed: 1948
- Jurisdiction: Government of Serbia
- Headquarters: Niš, Serbia; 43°19′36″N 21°53′39″E
- Parent agency: State Archives of Serbia
- Website: Official website

Map
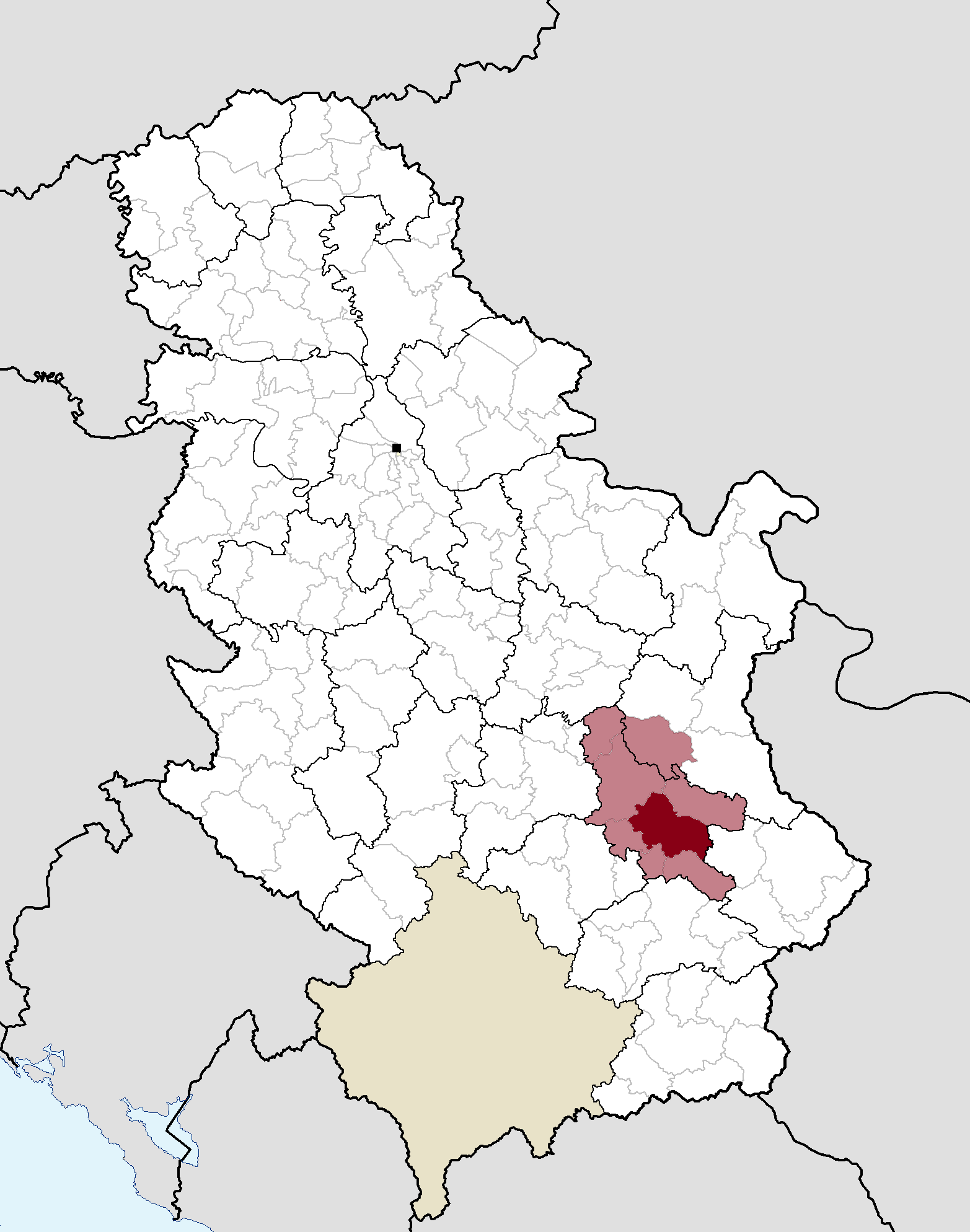
- Area served by the archives shown on the map of Serbia

The Historical Archives of Niš (Serbian: Историјски архив Ниш) are the primary institution responsible for preservation of archival materials in the Nišava District located in Niš, Serbia. The archives are primarily covering municipalities of Niš, Merošina, Sokobanja, Ražanj, Doljevac, Aleksinac, Svrljig, and Gadžin Han. The oldest documents kept at the archives are related to Habsburg occupation of Serbia in 1730s.

== See also ==
- List of archives in Serbia
- State Archives of Serbia
