= Historical Archives "Veroslava Veljašević" of Smederevska Palanka =

Serbian archival institution

- Историјски архив „Верослава Вељашевић“ Смедеревска Паланка (Serbian)

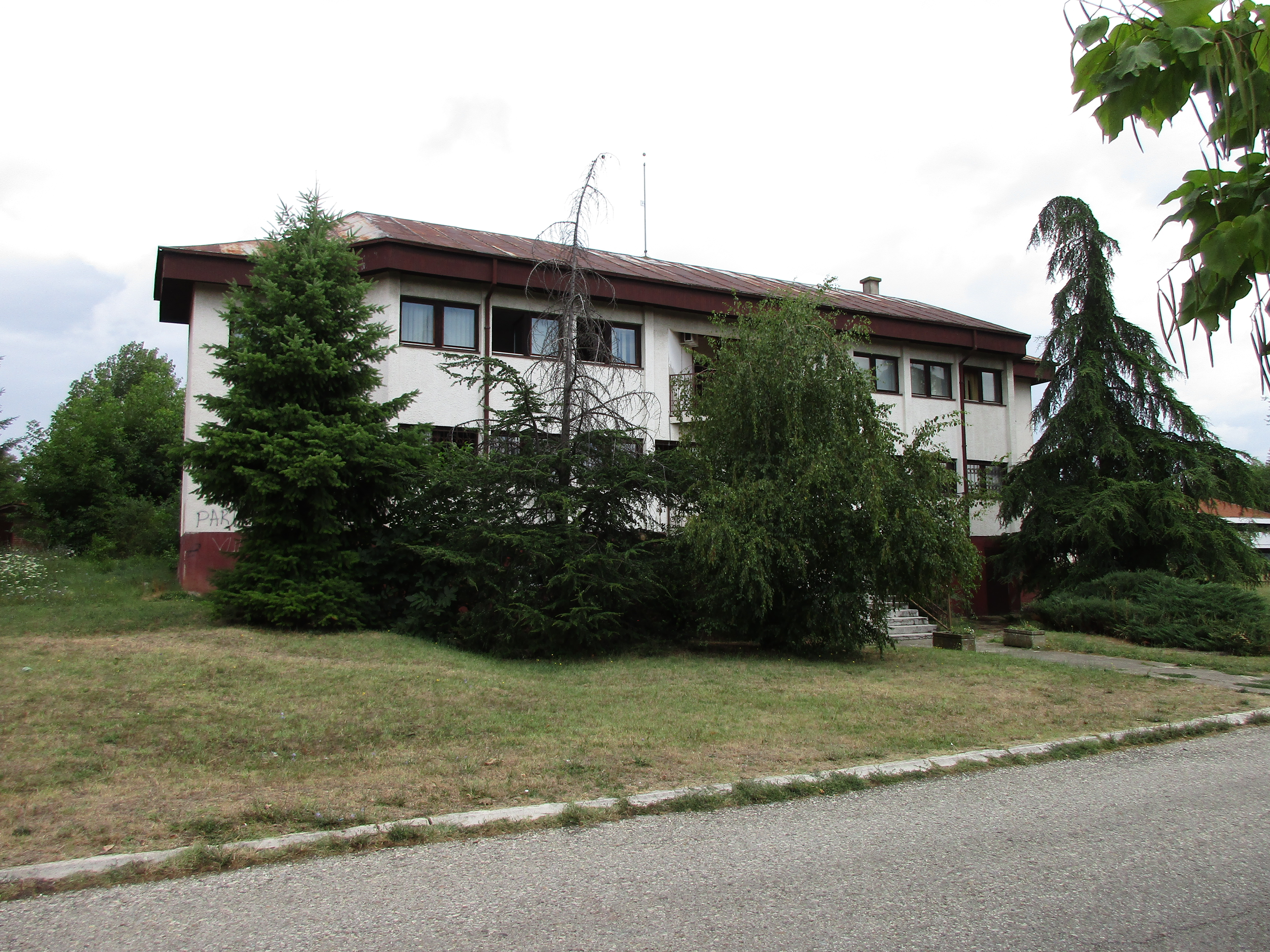
- Building housing the archives

Agency overview
- Formed: 1968
- Jurisdiction: Government of Serbia
- Headquarters: Omladinska 13, Smederevska Palanka, Serbia
- Parent agency: State Archives of Serbia
- Website: Official website

Map
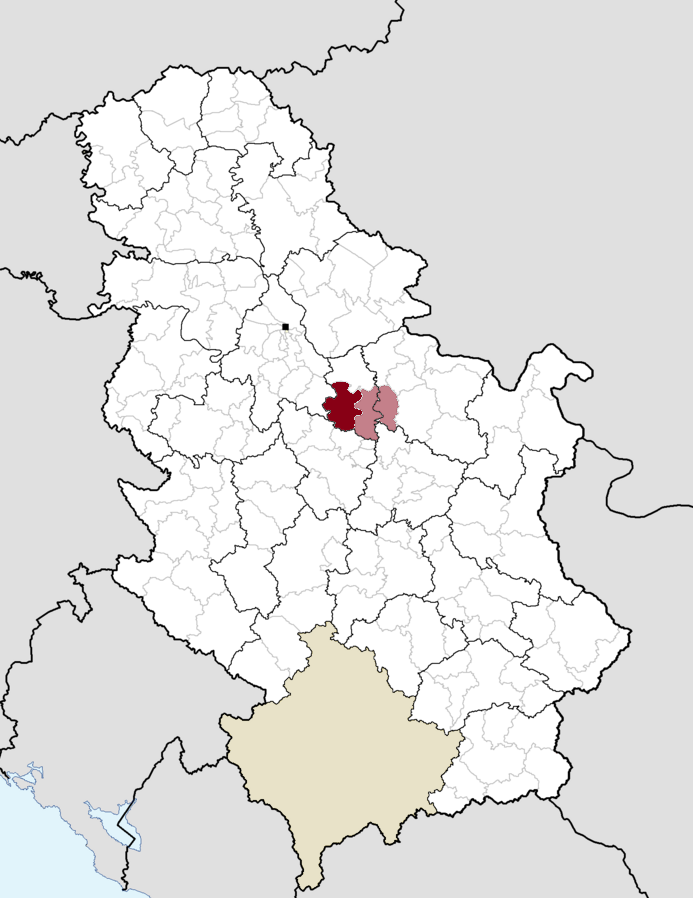
- Area served by the archives shown on the map of Serbia

The Historical Archives "Veroslava Veljašević" of Smederevska Palanka (Serbian: Историјски архив „Верослава Вељашевић“ Смедеревска Паланка) are the primary institution responsible for preservation of archival materials in the Podunavlje District (with the exception of Smederevo served by the Historical Archives of Smederevo) and westernmost parts of Braničevo District located in Smederevska Palanka, Serbia. The archives are primarily serving municipalities of Smederevska Palanka, Velika Plana, and Žabari.

== History ==
The archives were established by the city authorities of Smederevska Palanka in 1968 while it received regional responsibility for surrounding municipalities only in 1996 by the decision of the government of the Republic of Serbia.

In 2016, the archives were faced with a deep economic crisis when the City of Smederevska Palanka ended up bankrupt. The crisis was caused by the 2003 decision according to which archival work was funded by the City of Smederevska Palanka alone and not by other municipalities it served. At the time, the official website was closed down, phone number was shut down, and professional staff received their salaries irregularly.

== See also ==
- List of archives in Serbia
- State Archives of Serbia
