= Historical Archives of Užice =

- Историјски архив Ужице (Serbian)

Agency overview
- Formed: 1948; 78 years ago
- Jurisdiction: Government of Serbia
- Headquarters: Žička 17, 31 000 Užice, Serbia
- Parent agency: State Archives of Serbia
- Website: Official website

Map
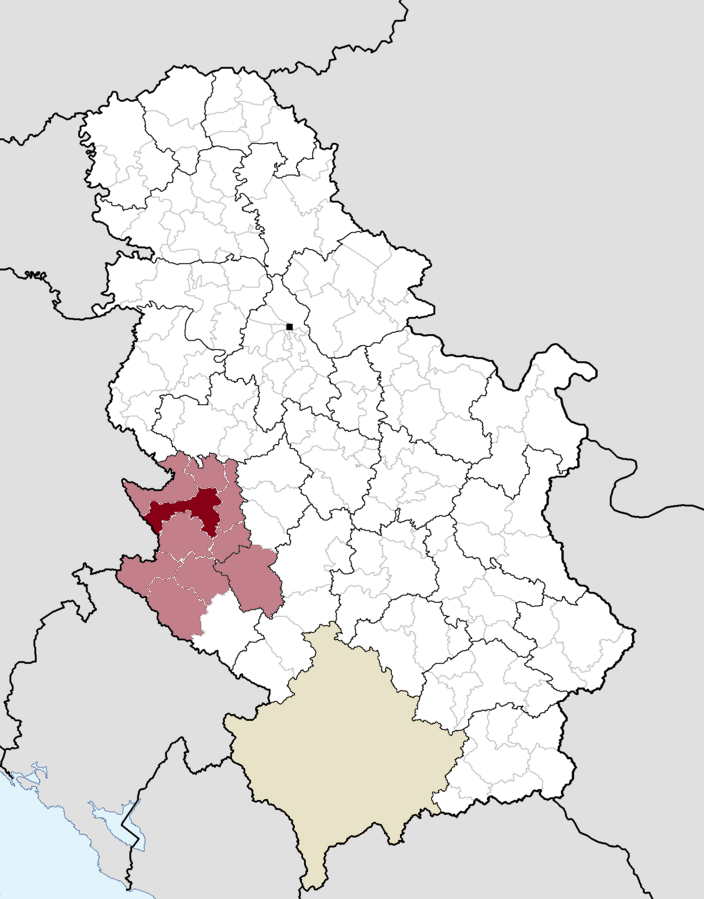
- Area served by the archives shown on the map of Serbia

The Historical Archives of Užice (Serbian: Историјски архив Ужице) are the primary institution responsible for preservation of archival materials in most of the Zlatibor District and southern parts of Moravica District located in Užice, Serbia. The archives are primarily serving municipalities of Užice, Bajina Bašta, Kosjerić, Požega, Arilje, Ivanjica, Čajetina, Nova Varoš, Priboj, Prijepolje. In 2009, the archives were moved into new purpose-built building housing archival material and administration.

== See also ==
- List of archives in Serbia
- State Archives of Serbia
