= State Archives of Serbia =

National archives of Serbia

Coordinates: 44.7300°N 20.3716°E

- Државни архив Србије
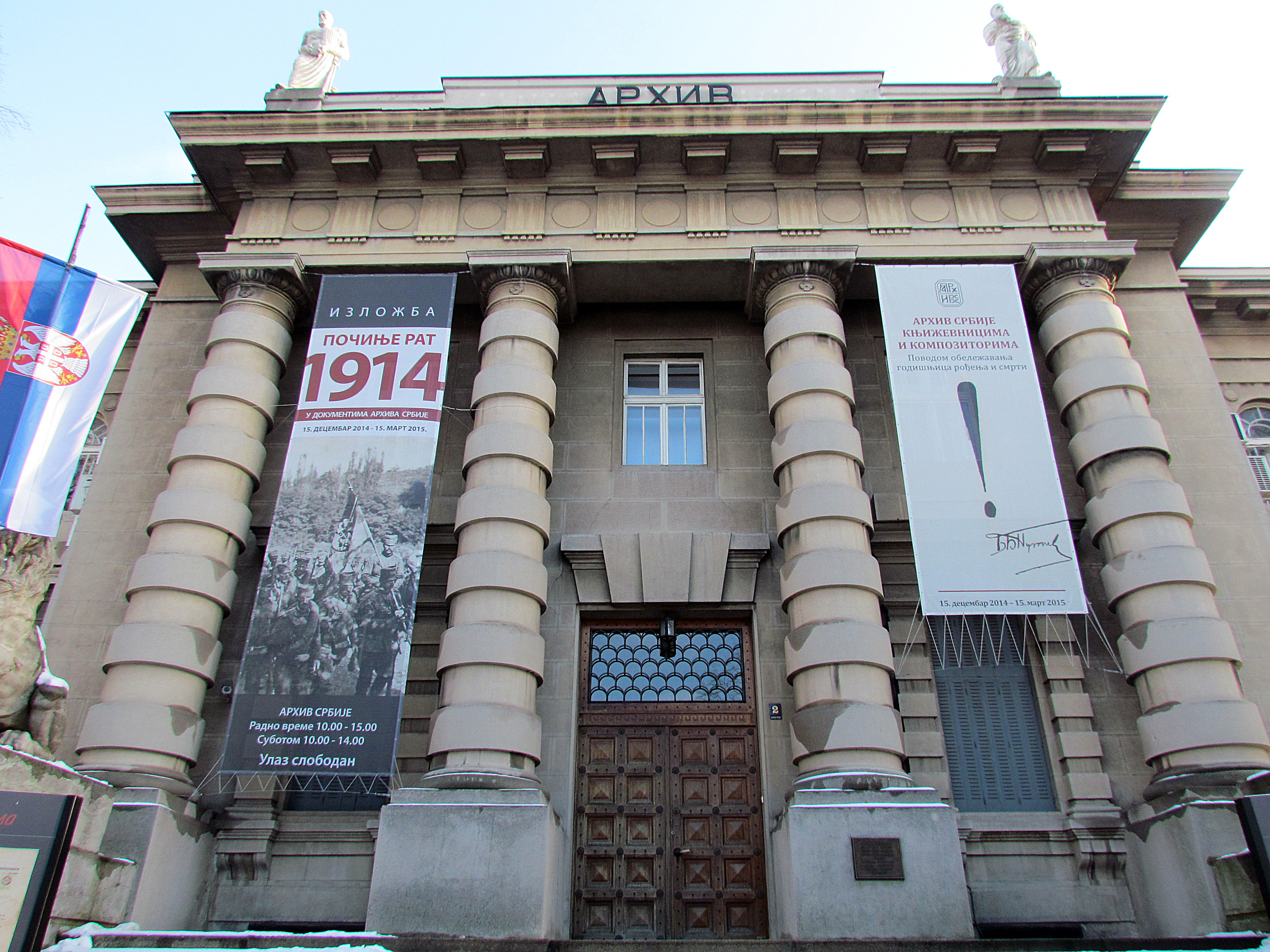
- Established: 1900
- Location: Karnegijeva 2, Belgrade
- Type: National Archives
- Director: dr Miroslav Perišić
- Website: www.archives.org.rs

The State Archives of Serbia (Serbian: Државни архив Србије, romanized: Državni arhiv Srbije), аre the national archives of Serbia, located in Belgrade. Тhey house and protect documents and other archival materials produced by state bodies and organizations of Serbia before 1918 (before Serbia became part of the Kingdom of Yugoslavia) and documents produced during and after World War II (when Serbia was federal subject of the Communist Yugoslavia and Serbia and Montenegro), as well as document since restoration of country's independence in 2006. Documents dating from the period when Serbia was part of Yugoslavia and issued by the state bodies and organizations of Yugoslavia from are kept in the Archives of Yugoslavia.

== History ==
The first proposal to establish the national archives came in 1846, but the Law on the State Archives was only adopted on 14 December [O.S. 2 December] 1898. The Archives began operation in 1900, and the founding members of the National Archives were: J. N. Ivković, Dr. M. Gavrilović, M. Rančić, and M. K. Borisavljević. Their first official name was the State Archives of the Kingdom of Serbia. Historian and diplomat Mihailo Gavrilović was the president of archives in the period 1900-1910. Gavrilović was chiefly responsible for early development and organisation of the archives. In this period the archives were located in residence of General Sava Grujić.

The name of the Archives was changed several times. Between 1918 and 1945 they were called State Archives (during this time they were the State Archives of the Kingdom of Yugoslavia). Between 1945 and 1948 the name was the State Archives of the Federal People's Republic of Yugoslavia. Between 1948 and 1969 it was the State Archives of the People's Republic of Serbia (the separate Archives of Yugoslavia were established in 1950). In 1969, the Archives were renamed the Archives of Serbia and in 2021 they changed name to the State Archives of Serbia.

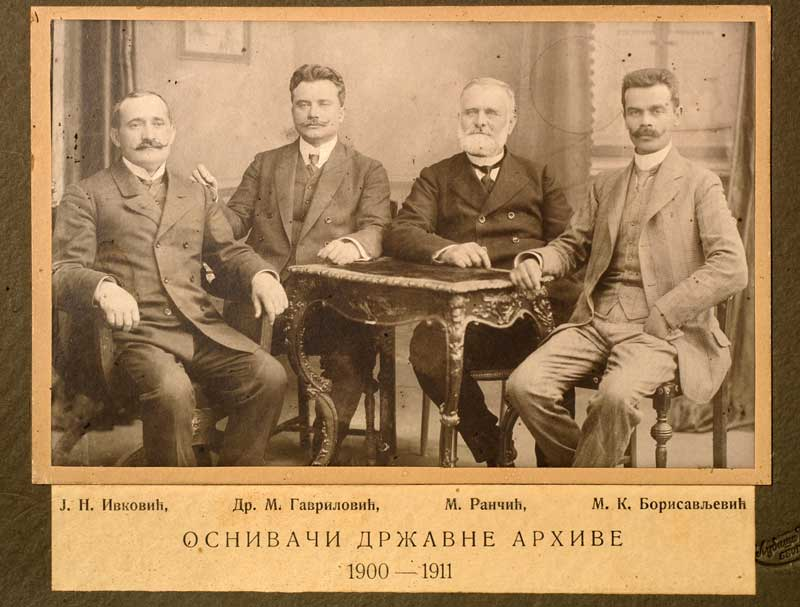
Founders of the State Archives of Serbia

During World War I, a part of archive material was moved to Niš and Kragujevac, but another part remained in Belgrade. During the retreat of the Serbian Army, some of the archives were destroyed, some lost, but much was preserved in a train car in the Kruševac Train Station. After the war, the archives became the State Archive of the newly formed Kingdom of Serbs, Croats, and Slovenes (Yugoslavia). The current building of the archives was built in 1928.

During the World War II, some of the archive material was confiscated by the Nazi German authorities. In 1941 total of 519 boxes from the period of Kingdom of Serbia were taken, and in 1942 total of 579 crates full of documents and 88 acts were transported to Vienna. German Army occupied the building in two periods, so much of the archive was moved to the Faculty of Technology and the Belgrade University Library and the most valuable items were placed in the National Bank's safes. After the war, the Archive became the State Archive of the newly formed Federal People's Republic of Yugoslavia, until 1 January 1948 when the separate Archives of Yugoslavia were formed.

Serbia today operates an extensive network of archives that cover the whole of the country's territory. Although the State Archives building in Belgrade was heavily damaged during World War II, the archives still hold a large amount of information that dates back to early medieval times.

== Archives and collections ==
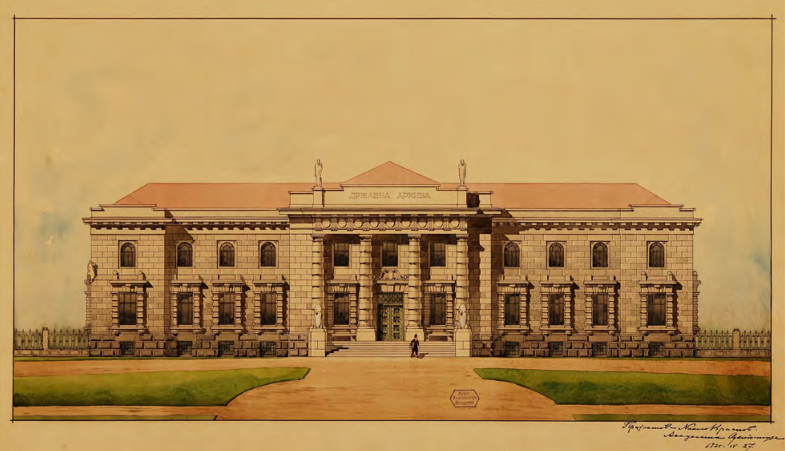
Project for the building by Nikolay Krasnov, 1925

Within its 972 archives and 51 collections, the State Archives of Serbia house 10 kilometers of historical records. When taking the time of origin into account, the archival materials are divided into two segments – the old and new period. The old period comprises the archival materials until the end of 1918, while the new period comprises the materials from World War II onward. The oldest historical records stored in the State Archives of Serbia, which originate from Serbia, are the records of the Principal Office (Office of the Prince of Serbia) (documents from 1815-1839). Besides that, the State Archives of Serbia also preserve private and family records and collections, as well as collections of statesmen, politicians, scientists, writers, cultural and public workers, and other important figures of Serbia.

Majority of old archival materials in the State Archives of Serbia date from the 19th century, but there are some which are even older. One historical record of great importance is the record of the Privileged Serbian municipality in Buda (documents from 1696 onward). The oldest document preserved in the Archive is the Visoki Dečani founding charter from 1330. Other notable documents are also kept in the Archive, including: documents issues by Karađorđe, Constitution of Principality of Serbia, Law on Proclamation of Kingdom of Serbia, tanners guild law proclaimed by Arsenije III Crnojević and others.

== Building of the State Archives of Serbia ==
The building which houses the State Archives of Serbia was erected in 1928 according to a project by Nikolai Krasnov. He emigrated from Russian Empire and worked for the Ministry of Architecture in the Kingdom of Yugoslavia. It is a one floor monumental building, in the shape of the letter "T", which is set upside down. The building is located at 2 Karnegijeva Street.

== See also ==
- List of archives in Serbia
- Archives of Vojvodina
