= Gallery of Matica srpska =

- Галерија Матице cрпске Galerija Matice srpske
- Logo of the Gallery of Matica srpska

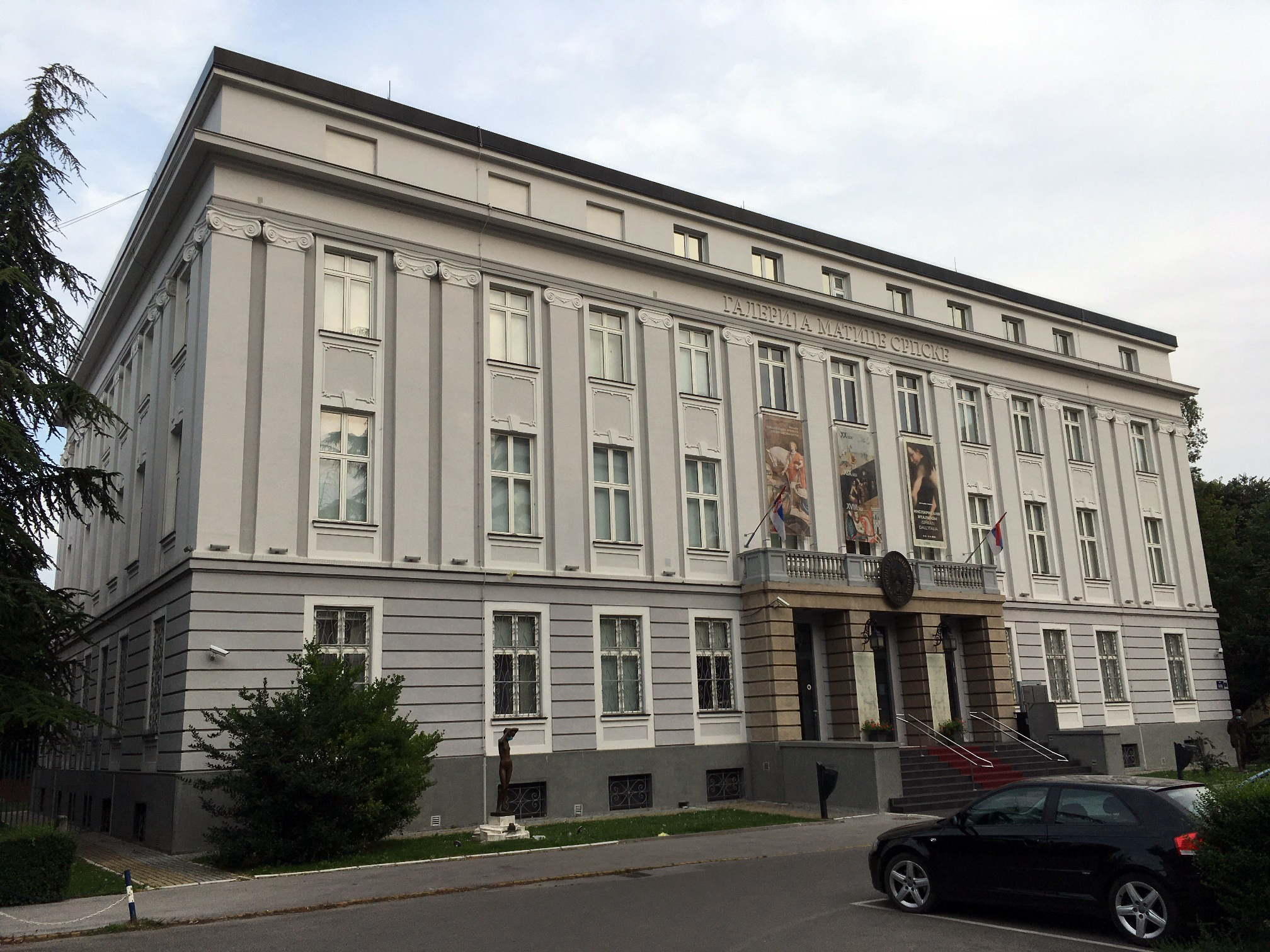
- The Gallery of Matica srpska entrance
- Established: 14 October 1847; 178 years ago
- Location: Novi Sad, Serbia
- Coordinates: 45.2525°N 19.8457°E
- Type: Art museum National History Museum
- Collection size: More than 7,000 paintings
- Directors: Tijana Palkovljević Bugarski (2010–present)
- Website: www.galerijamaticesrpske.rs

The Gallery of Matica srpska (Serbian: Galerija Matice srpske, Serbian Cyrillic: Галерија Матице српске) is one of the largest and oldest galleries in Serbia. It is located in the central zone of Novi Sad, next to Pavle Beljanski Memorial Collection.

The Gallery was established on 14 October 1847, with contributions from Sava Tekelija who left a valuable family portrait collection to the Matica Srpska, and other Serb merchants who made endowments and donations to the gallery.

The building of Gallery of Matica srpska was declared a Monument of Culture of Great Importance in 1979.

The Gallery of Matica srpska has acted as an independent institution apart from Matica srpska since 1958. Collections in The Gallery of Matica srpska mostly consists of paintings from all periods of the national history of art.

== Gallery ==
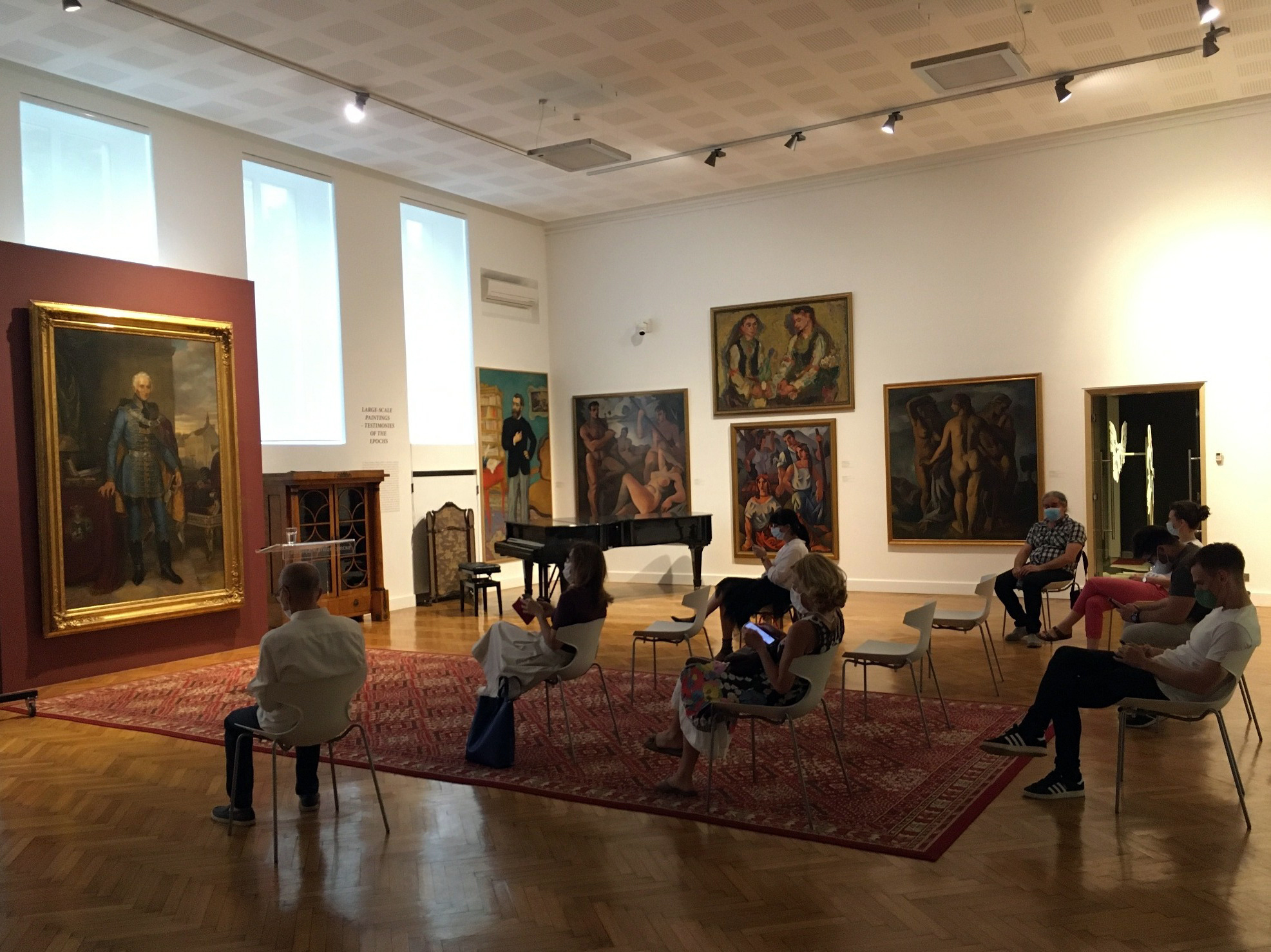
Monumental pictures and the hall for lectures

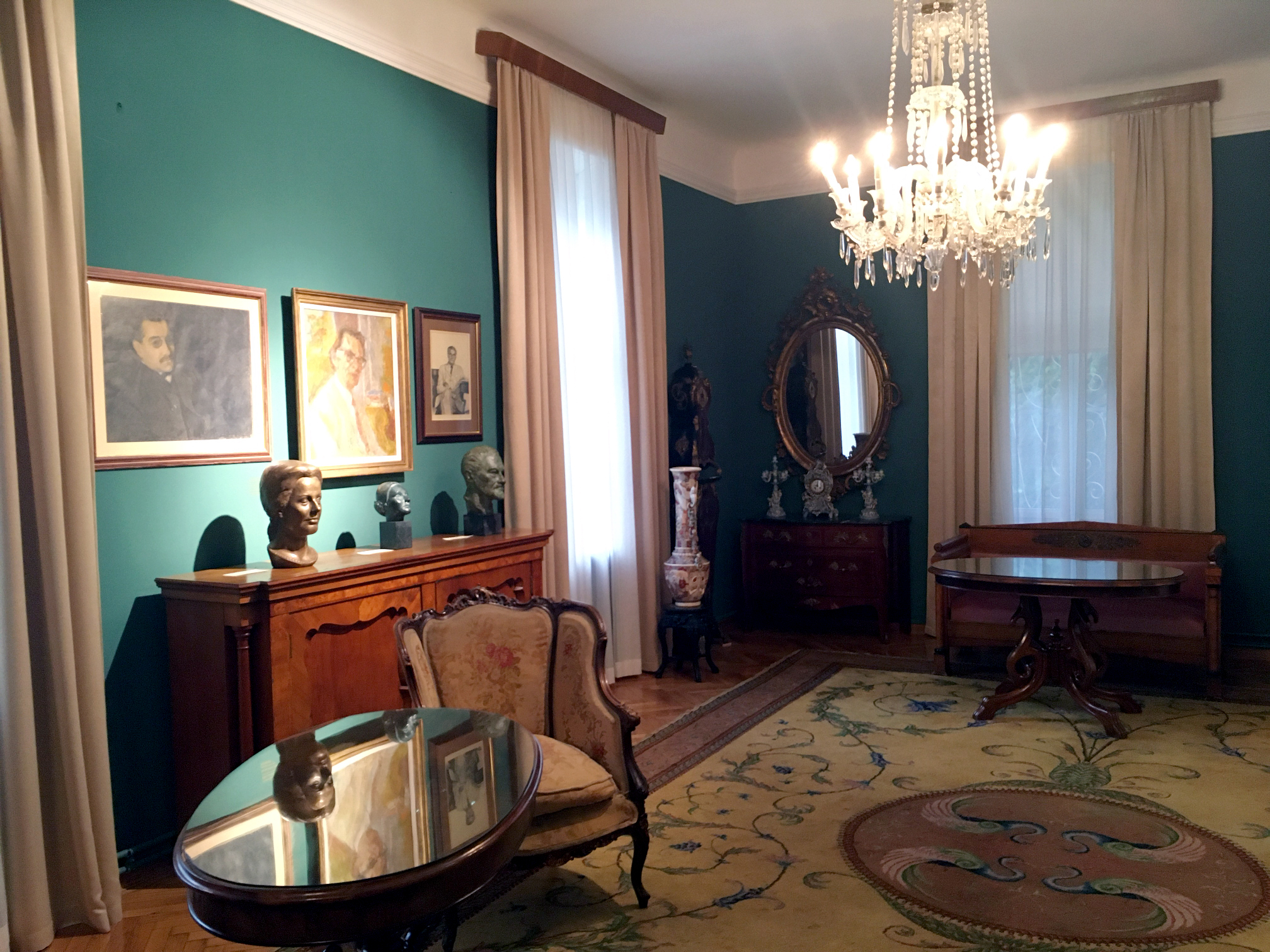
Furniture and works of art, endowment of architect Dragiša Brašovan

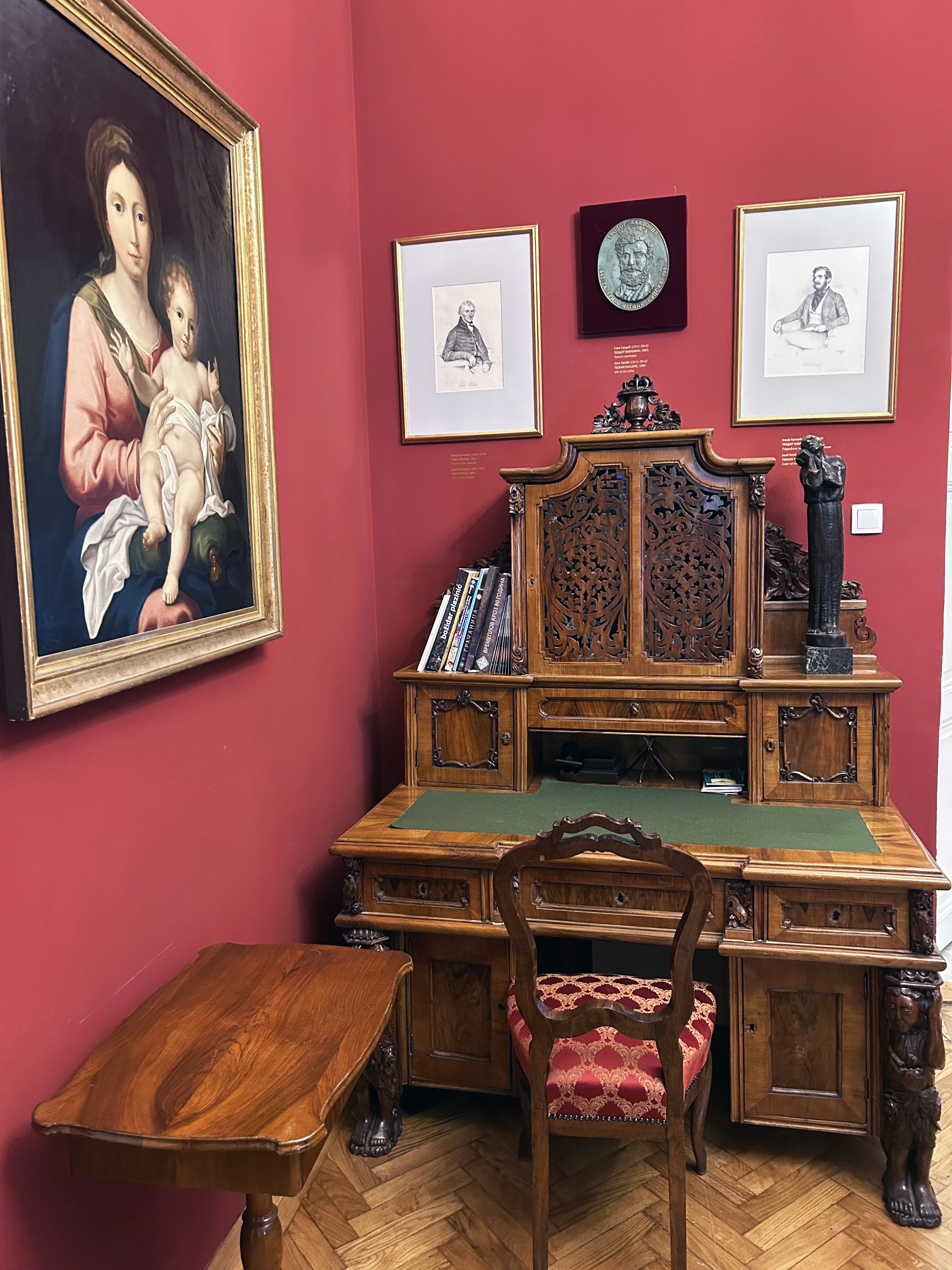
Furniture and works of art,

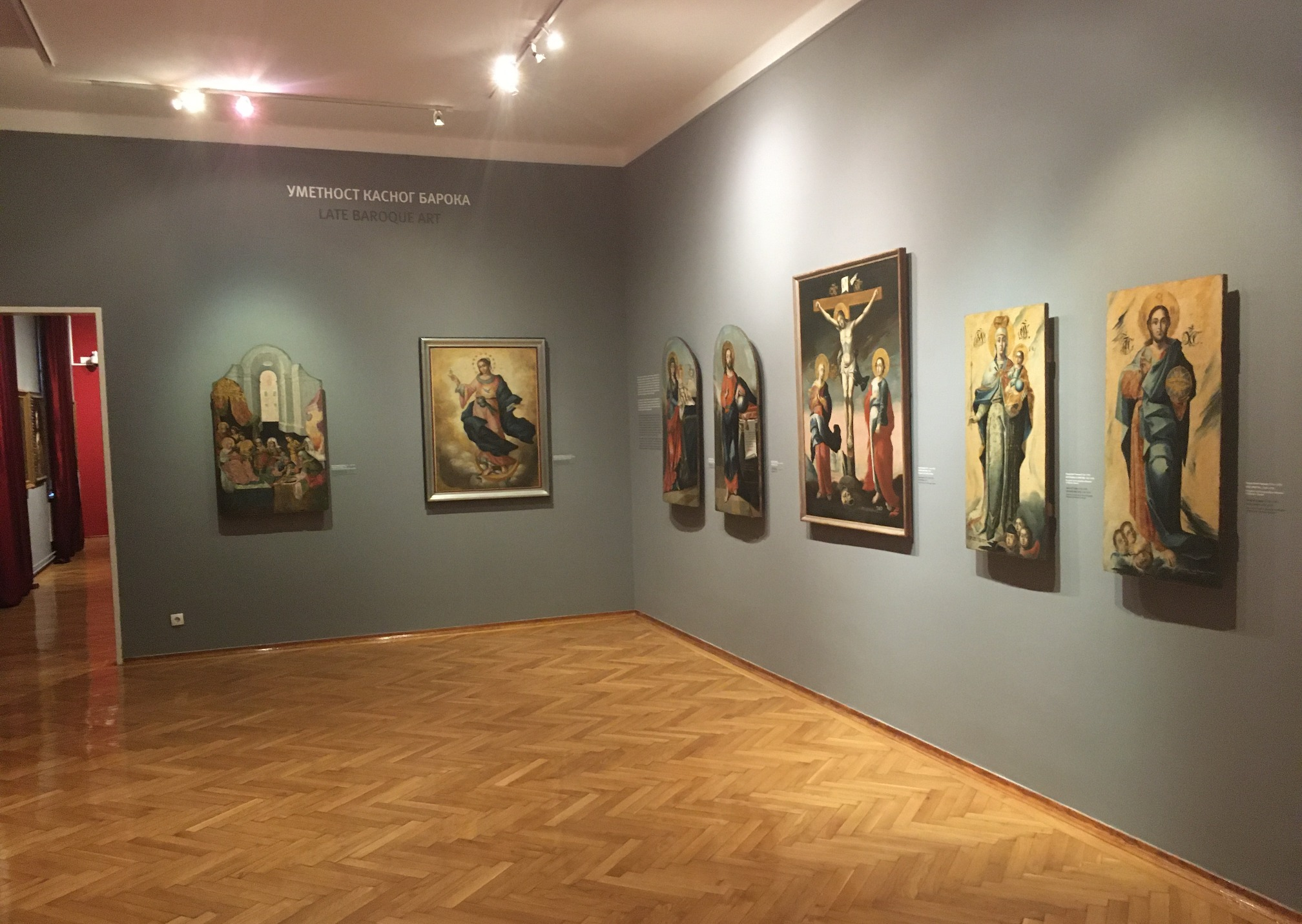
Late Baroque art

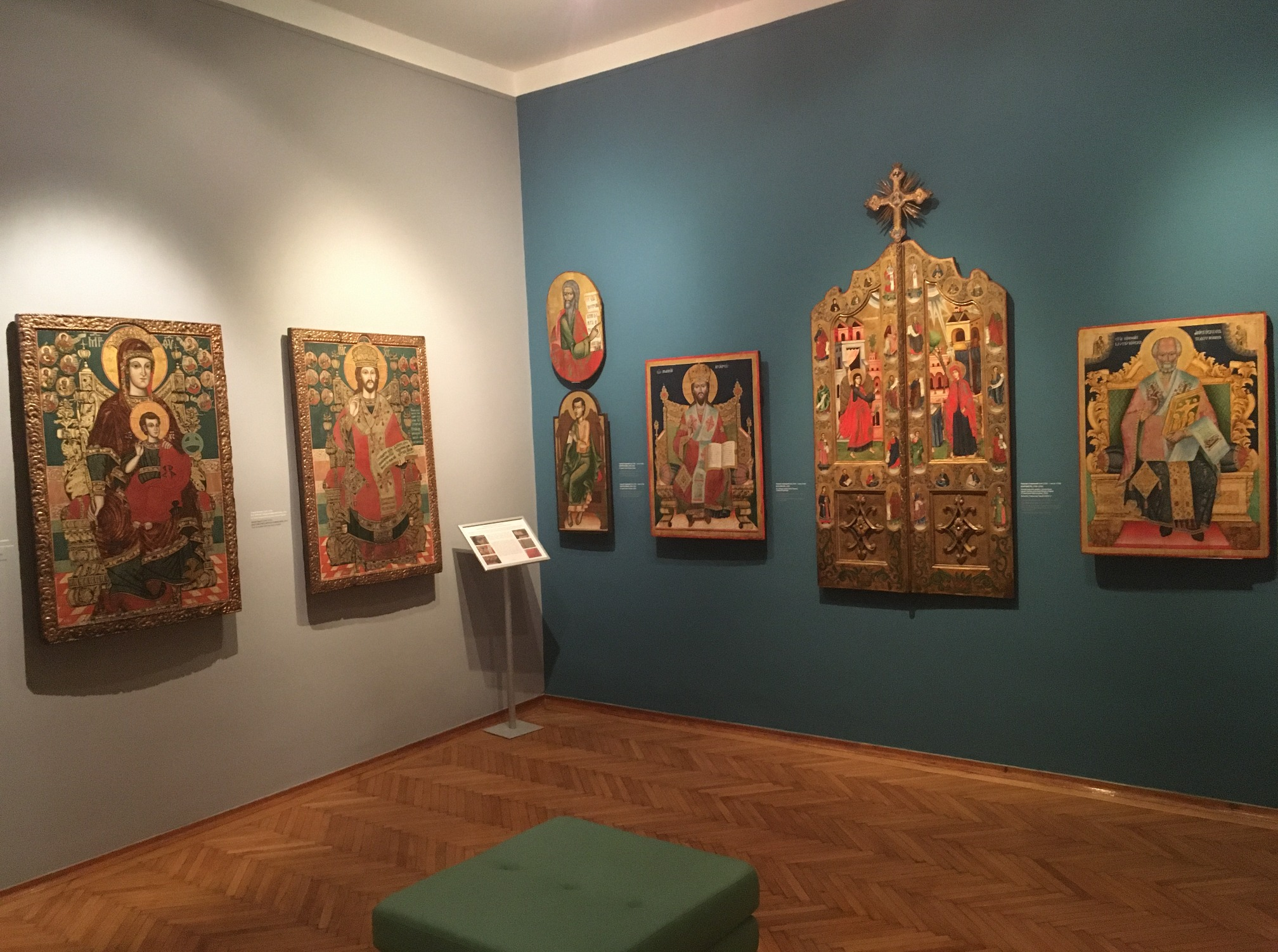
Icons and religious art

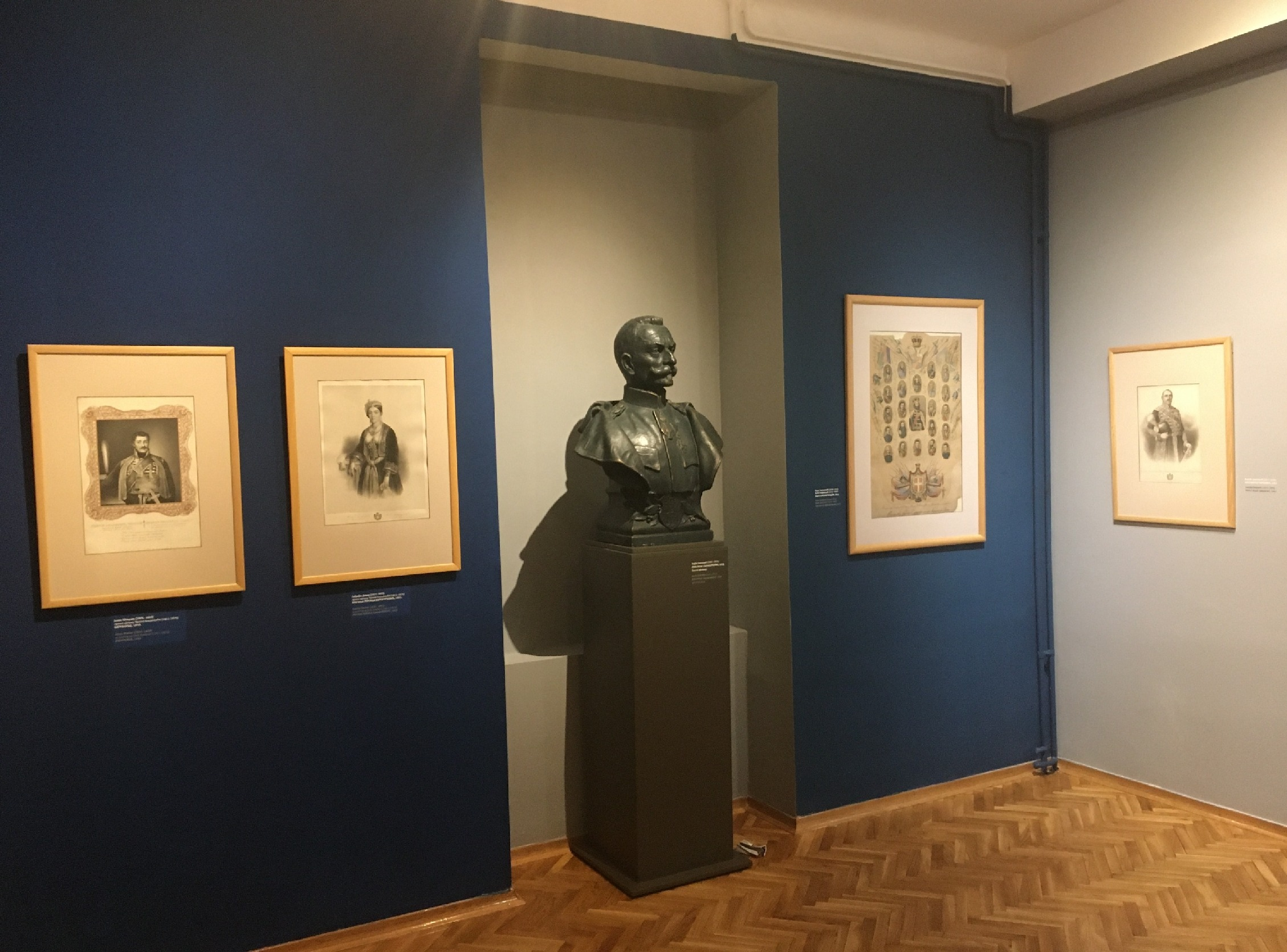
Bust of king Peter of Serbia and works representing Serbian nobility

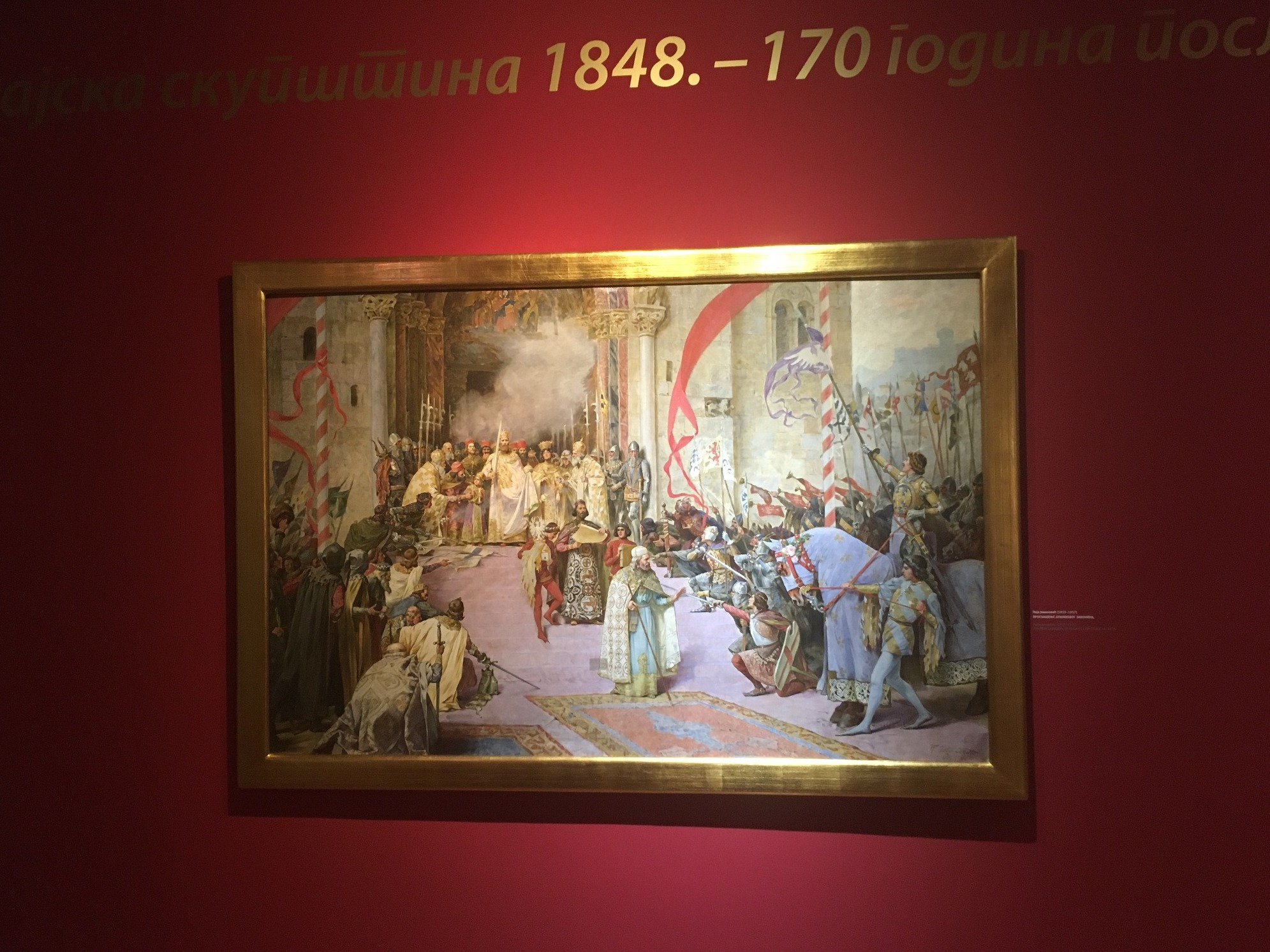
The Proclamation of Dušan's Law Codex

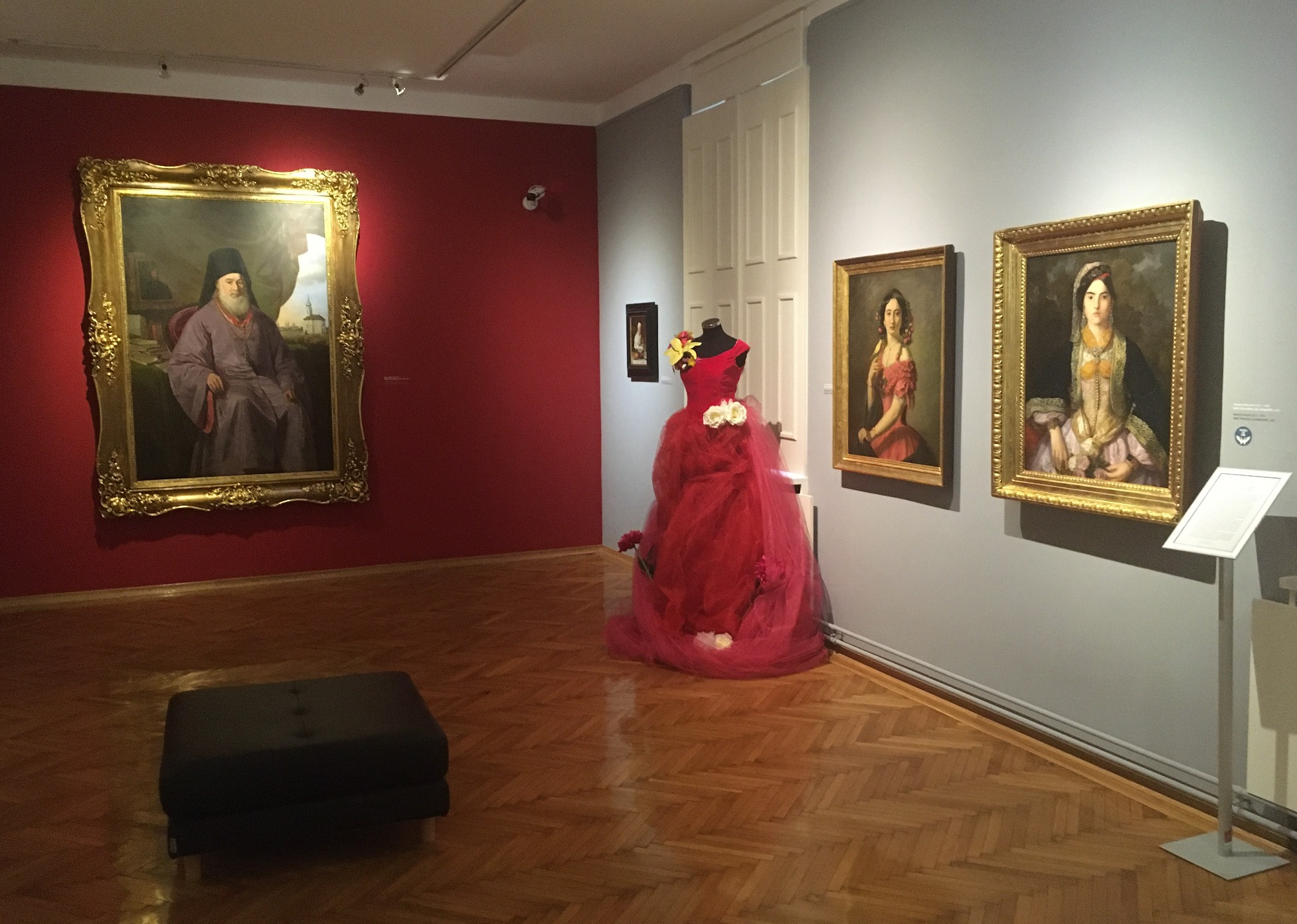
Portraits of 19th century elite

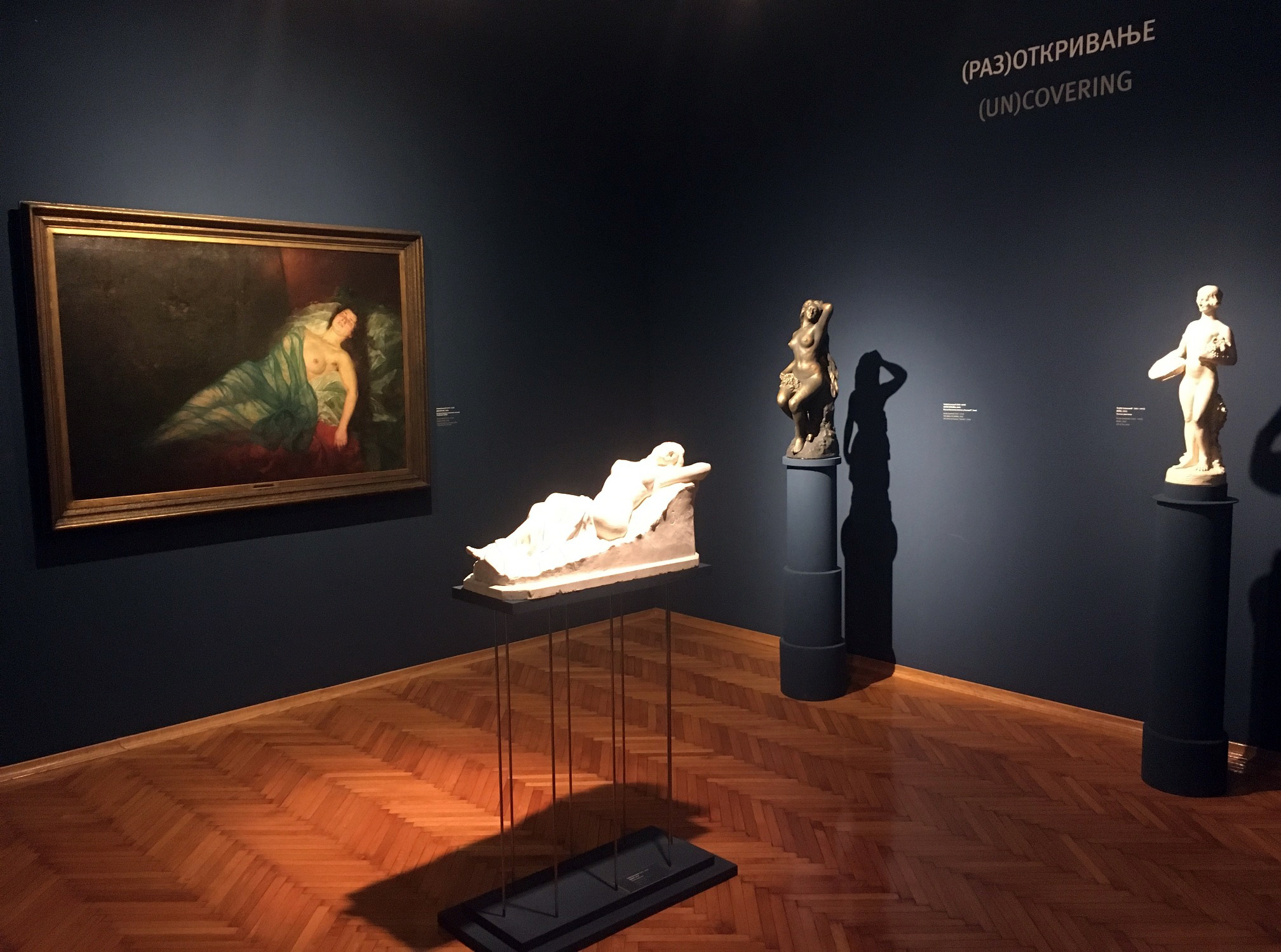
(Un)covering

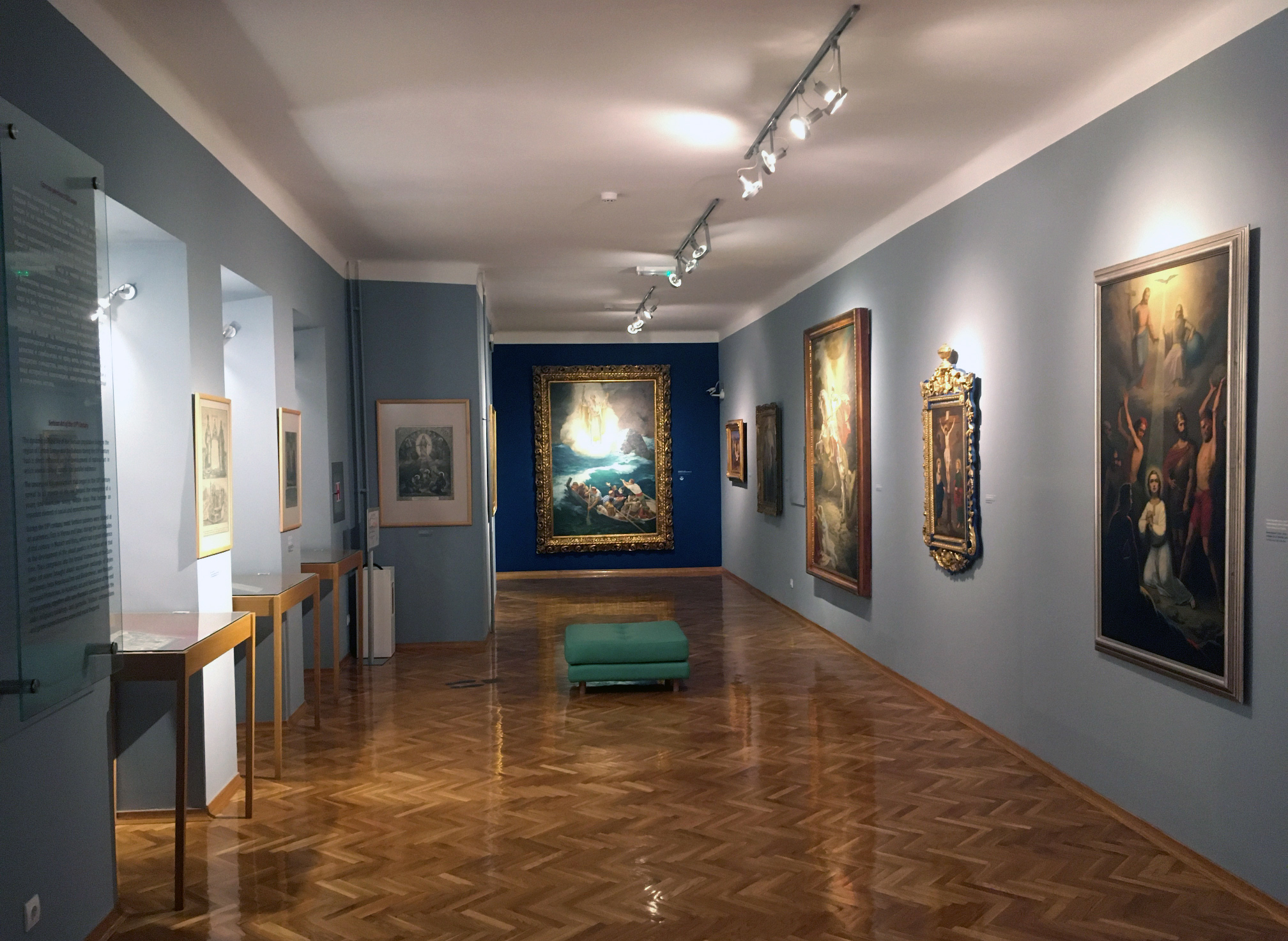
Religious art

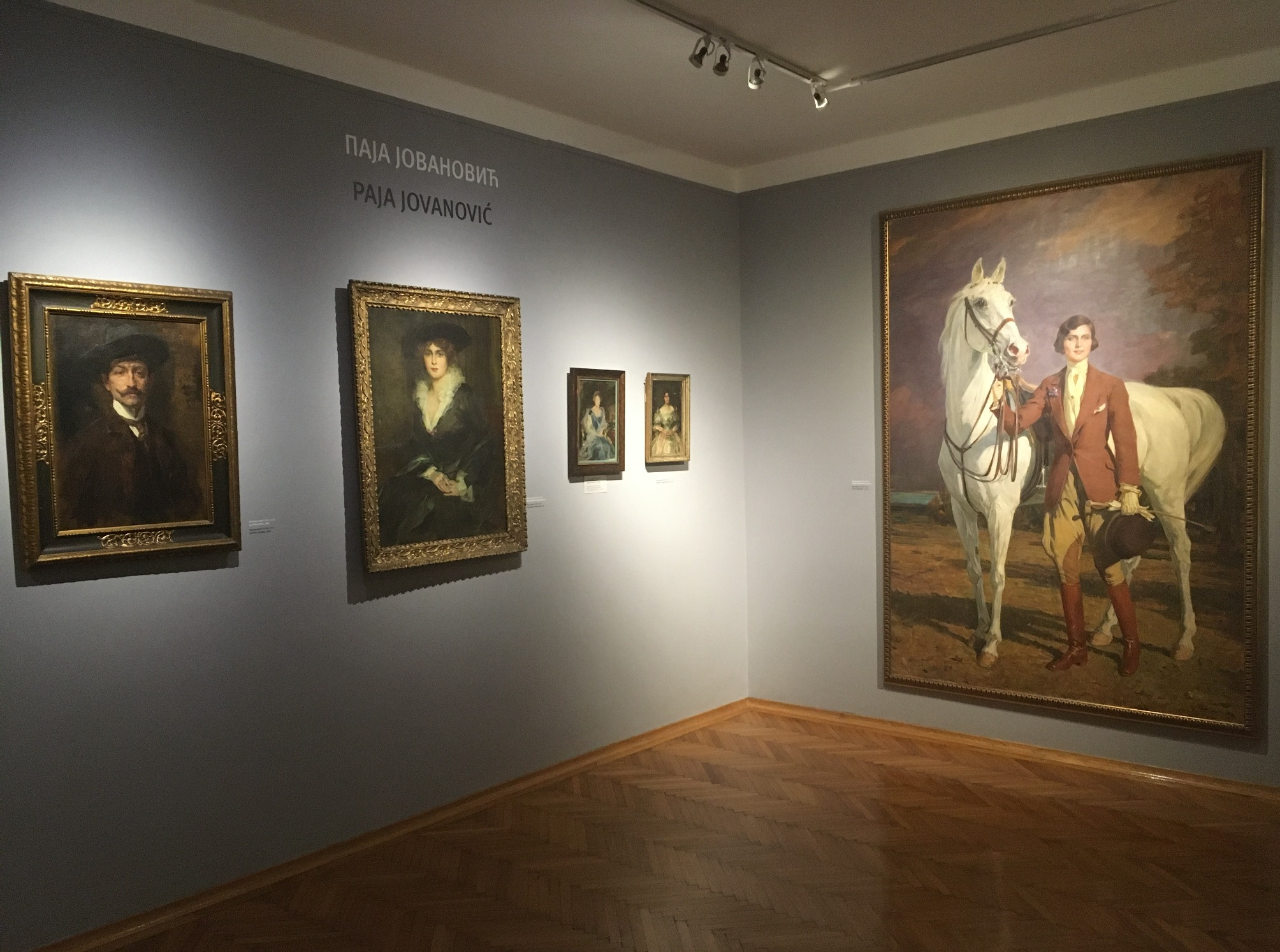
Works by Paja Jovanović

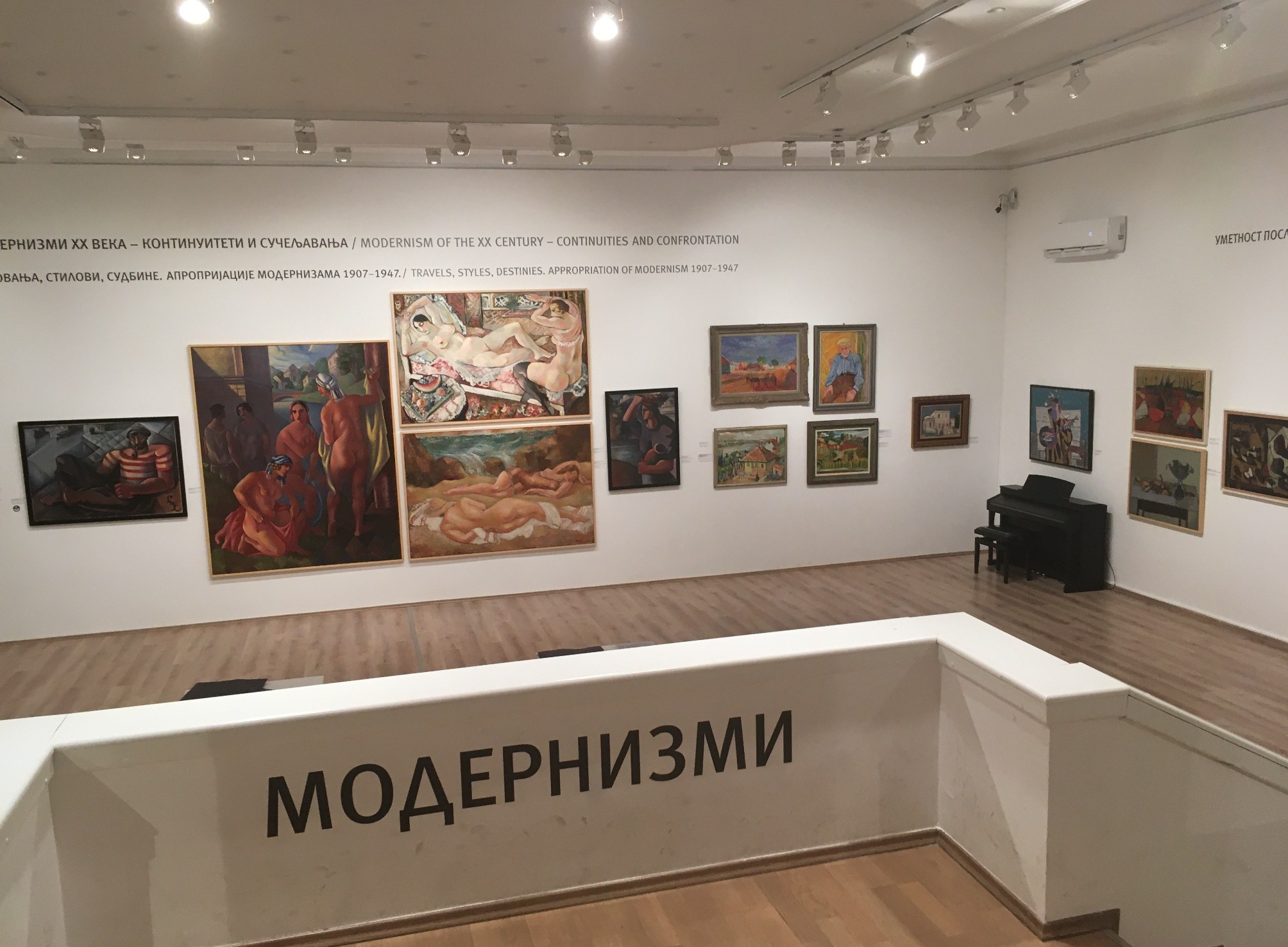
Modernism

The Wounded Montenegrin by Paja Jovanović (1882)

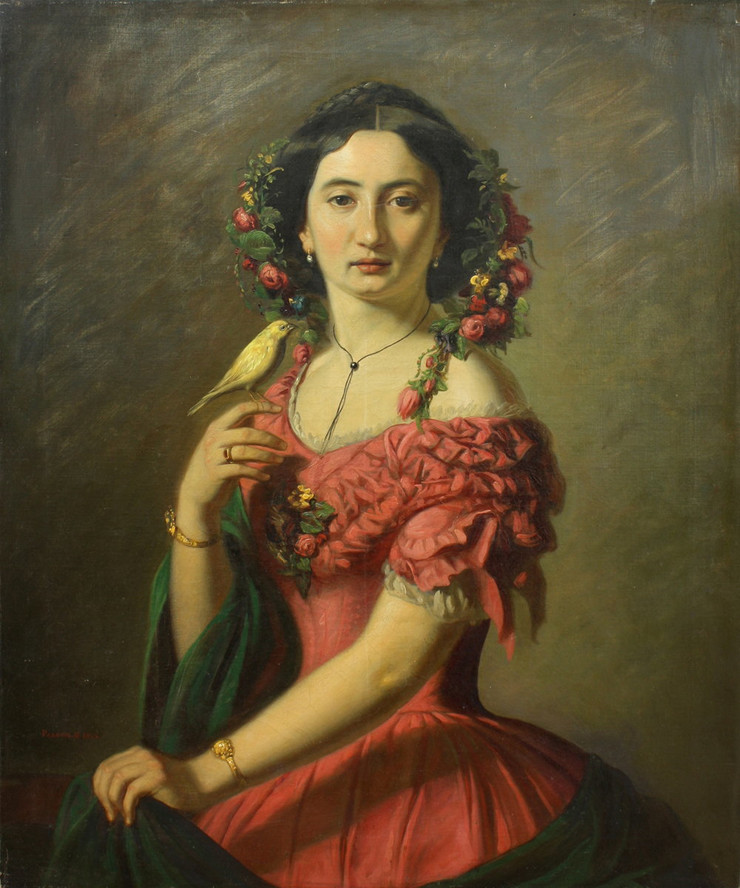
Girl with a canary by Novak Radonić (1865)

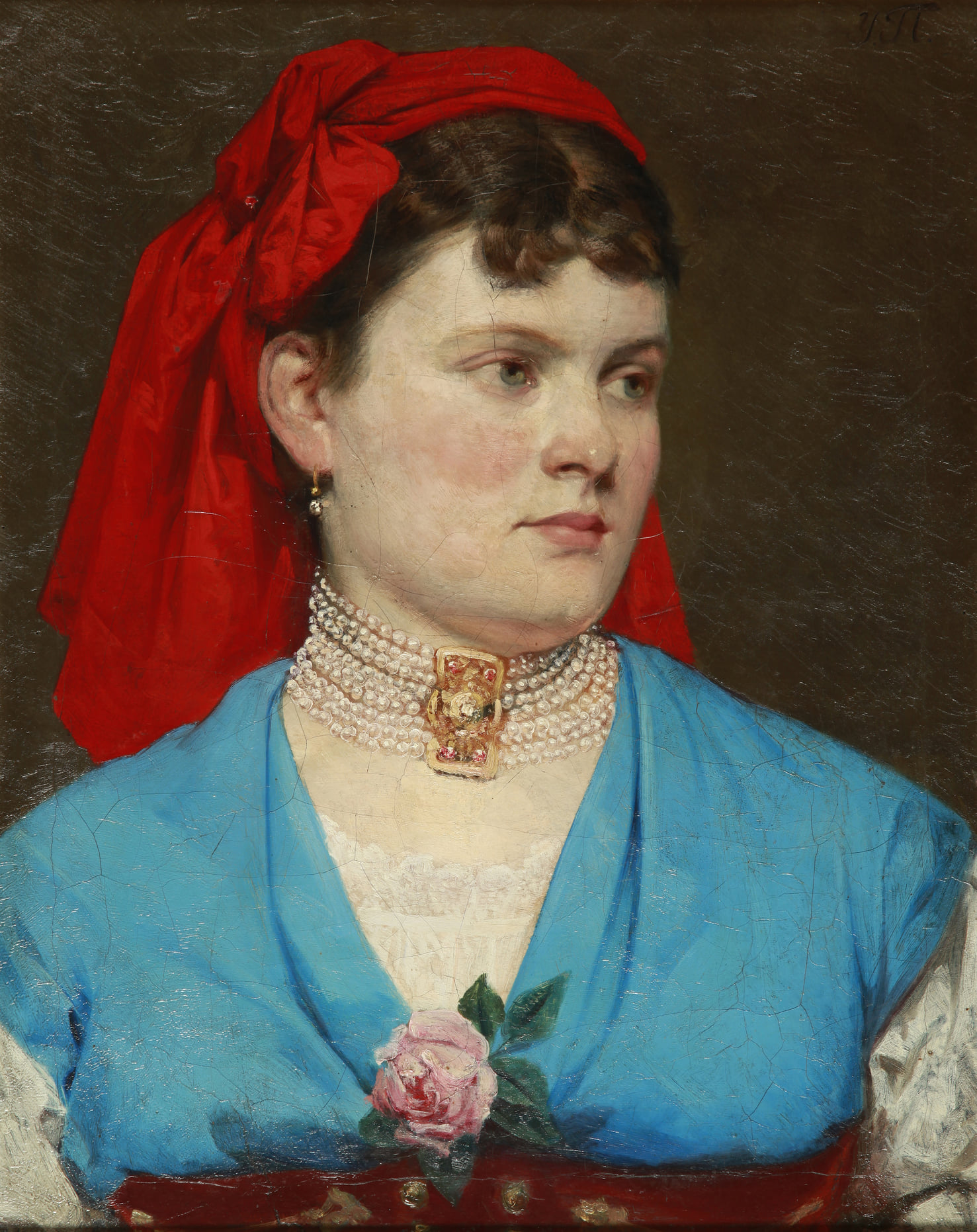
Moravkinja by Uroš Predić (1879-1880)

== See also ==
- List of museums in Serbia
