= Decorating of the Bride =

Painting by Paja Jovanović

- Kićenje neveste, Кићење невесте (Serbian)
- Artist: Paja Jovanović
- Year: 1885–1888
- Medium: Oil on canvas
- Dimensions: 96.5 cm × 136 cm (38.0 in × 54 in)
- Location: National Museum of Serbia; Belgrade

Decorating of the Bride (Serbian: Кићење невесте, Kićenje neveste) is an oil painting by the Serbian artist Paja Jovanović. It shows a young bride in traditional attire being prepared for her upcoming marriage by the female members of her household. It is one of two compositions Jovanović painted on the subject; the other is considered lost.

The painting was done between 1885 and 1888, during one of Jovanović's trips through the Balkans. It was painted for the French Gallery, with which Jovanović was under contract, and was well received by art critics and the public. It remained in the French Gallery's possession until 1893, when it was purchased by a London buyer. In 1935, the Yugoslav Ministry of Foreign Affairs purchased the work and bestowed it to the National Museum of Serbia, in whose possession it remains. In 2009, the painting began undergoing restoration.

== Description ==
Decorating of the Bride (Serbian: Kićenje neveste; Serbian Cyrillic: Кићење невесте) (Note: Also translated as Preparation of the Bride.) measures 96.5 by 136 centimetres (38.0 in × 53.5 in). The painting is set in an impoverished 19th-century ethnic Albanian household. It shows the women of the family adorning a young bride. The jewelry that the bride is supposed to wear at her wedding is taken from an old wooden chest that can be seen in the left-hand corner and is temporarily set against a copper tray beside her. Immediately next to the chest, a little girl holds another copper tray, which also contains several items of jewelry. Two elderly women attend to the bride. To the far right, young maidens fashion a garland of fresh flowers and joyfully whisper to one another. The room in which the women have gathered is sparsely furnished, with a low ceiling, well worn carpet and plain plastered walls. The bride wears traditional garb, with a gold necklace around her neck and delicately embroidered slippers on her feet. The artist's signature, Germanicized as P. Joanowitch, can be seen at the bottom right.

The painting has also been referred to as Nevesta ("The Bride"), Kite mladu ("The Bride is Being Decorated") and Oprema mlade ("Bridal Trousseau"). The artist did not assign titles to his works, as he felt that if a painting was well composed viewers would be able to deduce the title themselves. As such, the majority of his paintings are referred to by a number of different titles.

== History ==
Paja Jovanović (1859–1957) was one of the most famous Serbian realists of the late 19th century. From 1877 to 1882, he attended Vienna's Academy of Fine Arts, studying under Christian Griepenkerl and Leopold Müller, among others. In the early part of his career, he composed mostly Orientalist paintings, which were in high demand at the time. The paintings were based on his own experiences in the Balkans, the Middle East and North Africa, and assured his fame among art connoisseurs in the West.

Decorating of the Bride is one of Jovanović's Orientalist works, notable examples of which include The Wounded Montenegrin (1882), Fencing Lesson (1883) and Cockfight (1897). The painting is undated, and it remains unknown exactly when it was composed. Petar Petrović, the curator of the National Museum of Serbia, dates it to ca. 1885–86. Art historian Lilien Filipovitch-Robinson writes that it was painted in 1888. What is known for certain is that Jovanović painted it in the mid-1880s on one of his travels through the Balkans. One source contends that it was composed while the artist was visiting the town of Shkodër, in present-day Albania. Another version of the painting is said to have been created by the artist not long after the original, but is considered lost. An 1891 journal article describes this version as depicting two women decorating the bride, while to her left the bride's mother clasps her hands and cries with joy. This version is said to have shown a girl on the verge of tears standing by a door to the far left. On the right, a woman and young girl could be seen offering gifts to the bride. During conservatory examinations in 2009, it was discovered that Decorating of the Bride had been painted over a similar, earlier work. The artist appears to have shortened the right side of the canvas by about 7 centimetres (2.8 in), altered the appearance of the interior, and slightly modified the left side of the painting. Save for the shortened canvas length, the right side of the painting is identical to that in the final version.

Reproductive rights to the painting were acquired by Zagreb merchant Petar Nikolić shortly after its creation, and lithographic prints were published soon thereafter. The painting was owned by the French Gallery until 1893, when it was purchased by a London buyer. In 1935, the Yugoslav Ministry of Foreign Affairs purchased the work and gave it to the National Museum of Serbia. The painting is currently owned by the museum. It is classified under inventory number 31–115.

== Analysis ==
Warm tonalities dominate the composition, which is painted in a series of long and short strokes and with even distribution of lighting. Filipovitch-Robinson notes the intimate feel of the painting, which she attributes to Jovanović's familiarity with Balkan life. "He was not a stranger to the scene," she states. "He knew his cast of village characters, their interactions, attitudes and consequent expressions and body language." The composition itself, she continues, depicts both "preparation and celebration". The gold coins the bride is wearing, Filipovitch-Robinson observes, are part of the dowry, and signal "familial obligation and pride as well as contractual expectations even among villagers of modest means". She goes on to contrast the bride's elaborate garb with the impoverished plainness of her surroundings.

Filipovitch-Robinson asserts that the heart of Jovanović's appeal as an Orientalist lay in his "positive characterization of Balkan life". Modern scholars, she writes, have criticized the artist for overlooking the hardships of rural Balkan life. Filipovitch-Robinson believes that such criticism is unfounded, and draws parallels between Jovanović's Orientalist works and those of contemporary popular realists in France, whose works rarely had political connotations and yet were never criticized for neglecting social issues.

== Reception and legacy ==
The painting received praise from critics, collectors and the general public. It is widely considered one of Jovanović's finest works. According to Petrović and art restorer Sofija Kajtez, it is also one of his most famous. The two describe Decorating of the Bride as "artistically perfect", and argue that it played a critical role in the development of Serbian realism in the late 19th century, as did Jovanović's other Orientalist works.

== See also ==
- A Boyar Wedding Feast

== Bibliography ==
- Antić, Radmila (1970). Paja Jovanović. Belgrade, Yugoslavia: Belgrade City Museum. OCLC 18028481.
- Filipovitch-Robinson, Lilien (2002). "Nineteenth-Century Serbian Painting: A Confluence of Nationalism and Secularism" (PDF). Journal of the North American Society for Serbian Studies. 16 (2). Bloomington, Indiana: Slavica Publishers: 361–368. ISSN 0742-3330. Archived from the original (PDF) on 22 March 2016.
- Filipovitch-Robinson, Lilien (2008). "Paja Jovanović and the Imagining of War and Peace" (PDF). Journal of the North American Society for Serbian Studies. 22 (1). Bloomington, Indiana: Slavica Publishers: 35–53. ISSN 0742-3330. Archived from the original (PDF) on 8 December 2015.
- Filipovitch-Robinson, Lilien (2014). "From Tradition to Modernism: Uroš Predić and Paja Jovanović". In Bogdanović, Jelena; Filipovitch-Robinson, Lilien; Marjanović, Igor (eds.). On the Very Edge: Modernism and Modernity in the Arts and Architecture of Interwar Serbia (1918–1941). Leuven, Belgium: Leuven University Press. pp. 31–63. ISBN 978-90-5867-993-2.
- Hudhri, Ferid (2003). Albania Through Art. Berat, Albania: Onufri. ISBN 978-99927-53-67-5.
- Kusovac, Nikola (2009). Паја Јовановић [Paja Jovanović] (in Serbian). Belgrade: National Museum of Serbia. ISBN 978-86-80619-55-2.
- Petrović, Petar (2012). Паја Јовановић: Систематски каталог дела [Paja Jovanović: A Systematic Catalogue of His Works] (in Serbian). Belgrade: National Museum of Serbia. ISBN 978-86-7269-130-6.
