= Vršac triptych =

Oil painting by Paja Jovanovic

Coordinates: 45°7′N 21°18′E

Paja Jovanović, Vršac triptych (Vršački triptihon), c. 1895, oil on canvas, 1 × 200 by 200 centimetres (79 by 79 in) and 2 × 200 by 100 centimetres (79 by 39 in), Vršac City Museum

Sowing and Harvesting and Market, popularly referred to as the Vršac triptych, is a three-panel oil painting by the Serbian realist Paja Jovanović. Painted around 1895, it shows the everyday interactions of the inhabitants of Vršac, a multi-ethnic and multi-religious town in the Banat region of Austria-Hungary of which Jovanović was a native. The painting was commissioned by the Vršac city council in 1895 for the following year's Budapest Millennium Exhibition.

The triptych's centre panel measures 200 by 200 centimetres (79 by 79 in) and the two side panels measure 200 by 100 centimetres (79 by 39 in) each. The left panel is a market scene, the centre panel shows peasants harvesting grapes from a row of vines and the one to the right is an image of a farmer sharpening his scythe as two others labour in the background.

The triptych was originally intended to be displayed alongside another one of Jovanović's paintings, Migration of the Serbs, which had been commissioned by the Patriarchate of Karlovci. The Patriarch's dissatisfaction with the latter and his insistence that it be altered to his liking resulted in only the Vršac triptych being sent to Budapest, as Jovanović was not able to make the necessary revisions to Migration of the Serbs in time. The triptych was met with acclaim at the Exhibition and Jovanović was awarded a gold medal for his work, with critics praising his mastery of pleinairism. The painting is now on permanent exhibition at the Vršac City Museum.

== Background ==
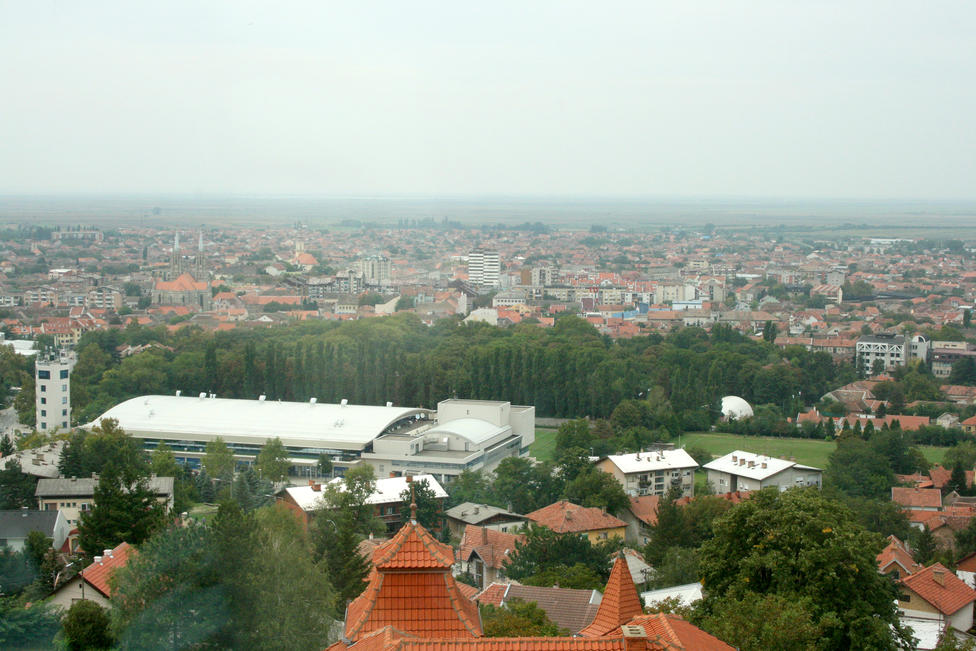
Overview of Vršac in the 21st century

The realist Paja Jovanović (1859–1957) was one of the most successful 19th- and 20th-century Serbian painters. He was a native of the town of Vršac, then part of the Hungarian-administered Banat region of Austria-Hungary, which had a mixed population of Serbs, Hungarians and Germans. Most of the Serbs were descended from 14th-century migrants fleeing the Ottoman advance following the Battle of Kosovo in June 1389. Such diversity and multiculturalism ensured the town's reputation for prosperity and cultural enlightenment. Jovanović's artistic abilities were noticed at an early age, and nourished by his father, a professional photographer. His early development was informed by the portraits and religious paintings of artists such as Pavel Đurković, Jovan Popović and Arsenije Teodorović. Jovanović's early copies of the artworks available to him in Vršac brought him instant recognition and steered him towards a career in the arts. In his adolescence, the artist had observed people from the Vršac countryside and their customs, and compiled sketches of natural and man-made structures in and around the town. While a student, he was commissioned to draw a series of preparatory sketches for the bell tower of his hometown's main church.

From 1877 to 1882, Jovanović honed his artistic skills at Vienna's Academy of Fine Arts, studying under Christian Griepenkerl and Leopold Müller, among others. In the early part of his career, he painted mostly Orientalist works, which were in high demand at the time. The paintings were based on his own experiences in the Balkans, the Middle East and North Africa, and assured his fame among art connoisseurs in the West. In the late 1880s, Jovanović turned to history painting, depicting scenes from the history of the Serb people, as seen in The Takovo Uprising (1888). Nevertheless, his reputation as an Orientalist meant that he was best known for these types of works in his first decade as a professional artist.

== The painting ==
=== Commissioning and composition ===
In the early 1890s, Hungarian officials announced plans for a Budapest Millennium Exhibition to be held in 1896; it was intended to mark the 1,000th anniversary of the Hungarian conquest of the Carpathian Basin, reaffirm Hungary's "national and territorial legitimacy" and the Hungarian people's "natural and historical right in the areas they inhabited". The Exhibition was to be held at Budapest's City Park. Exhibits were to be divided into twelve distinct areas, one of which was visual art. Several pavilions displaying the cultural and industrial achievements of non-Hungarians living in the Hungarian-administered territories of Austria-Hungary were also built, including one for the Serbs. In 1895, the Vršac city council hired Jovanović to paint a composition of the town to be displayed in Budapest. The Vršac triptych became one of two compositions that Jovanović created for the Exhibition, the other being Migration of the Serbs, which was commissioned by the Patriarchate of Karlovci (Note: The town of Sremski Karlovci, with its Serbian Orthodox Patriarchate, had been the main centre of Habsburg Serb cultural and religious life since the late 17th century.) that same year and depicts the Great Migration of the Serbs of 1690. (Note: The art historian Lilien Filipovitch-Robinson erroneously states that both paintings were commissioned by the Patriarchate. An 1895 article from the Novi Sad-based publication Zastava says the painting was ordered by the Vršac city council, leaving little doubt as to who commissioned it.)

The composition representing Vršac at the Exhibition was originally meant to depict folk hero Janko Halabura fighting the Turks, an idea to which Jovanović took a liking. The Vršac council members soon changed their minds, and Jovanović was asked to paint a composition showing the everyday lives of the town's inhabitants. Over the course of the triptych's creation, Jovanović visited his hometown on a number of occasions for the purpose of sketching its people and structures. The triptych proved to be a particularly difficult undertaking. Jovanović's firm grasp in Western Medieval panel and mural painting proved of great importance. Earlier, Jovanović had been the recipient of several church commissions that called for multi-sectional painting, though not to the same extent as some of his contemporaries, such as Uroš Predić. Each scene needed to connect seamlessly with the others, and Jovanović was met with the additional challenge of painting a number of figures engaged in actions requiring precise definition. The artist addressed this by carefully drawing each figure, the landscape and the panels themselves so as to ensure compositional unity. To ensure natural light, Jovanović painted the triptych out of studio, en plein air. It took the artist about ten months to complete.

=== Description ===
The Vršac triptych (Serbian: Vršački triptihon; Serbian Cyrillic: Вршачки триптихон), originally publicized as Sowing and Harvesting and Market (Serbian: Žetve, berbe i pijaca; Serbian Cyrillic: Жетве, бербе и пијаца), (Note: Jovanović did not give titles to his paintings and normally left it to the venue exhibiting his works to assign them names.) is a three-panel oil painting that Jovanović created in 1895. The centre panel measures 200 by 200 centimetres (79 by 79 in) and the two side panels measure 200 by 100 centimetres (79 by 39 in).

The left panel shows villagers and city-dwellers – Serbs, Hungarians and Germans – meeting in Vršac's main square to sell and purchase items, as well as simply to converse. The scene is set around mid-morning. It occurs against the backdrop of a row of shiny, white-washed buildings and the spire of the town's main church is also visible in the background. All the figures are dressed in costumes traditionally worn by their compatriots, making it easier for the viewer to discern their ethnicity. "They interact with ease", the art historian Lilien Filipovitch-Robinson writes, "and an aura of general good will envelops the scene". The centre panel depicts a group of peasants in the countryside gathering grapes from a row of vines. The panel to the right shows villagers harvesting their ripened wheat. Two figures are seen bending over in the background, sickles in hand, while a third sharpens his scythe in the foreground. The artist's signature, Joanowits P, can be found in the bottom right-hand corner of the centre panel.

== Analysis ==
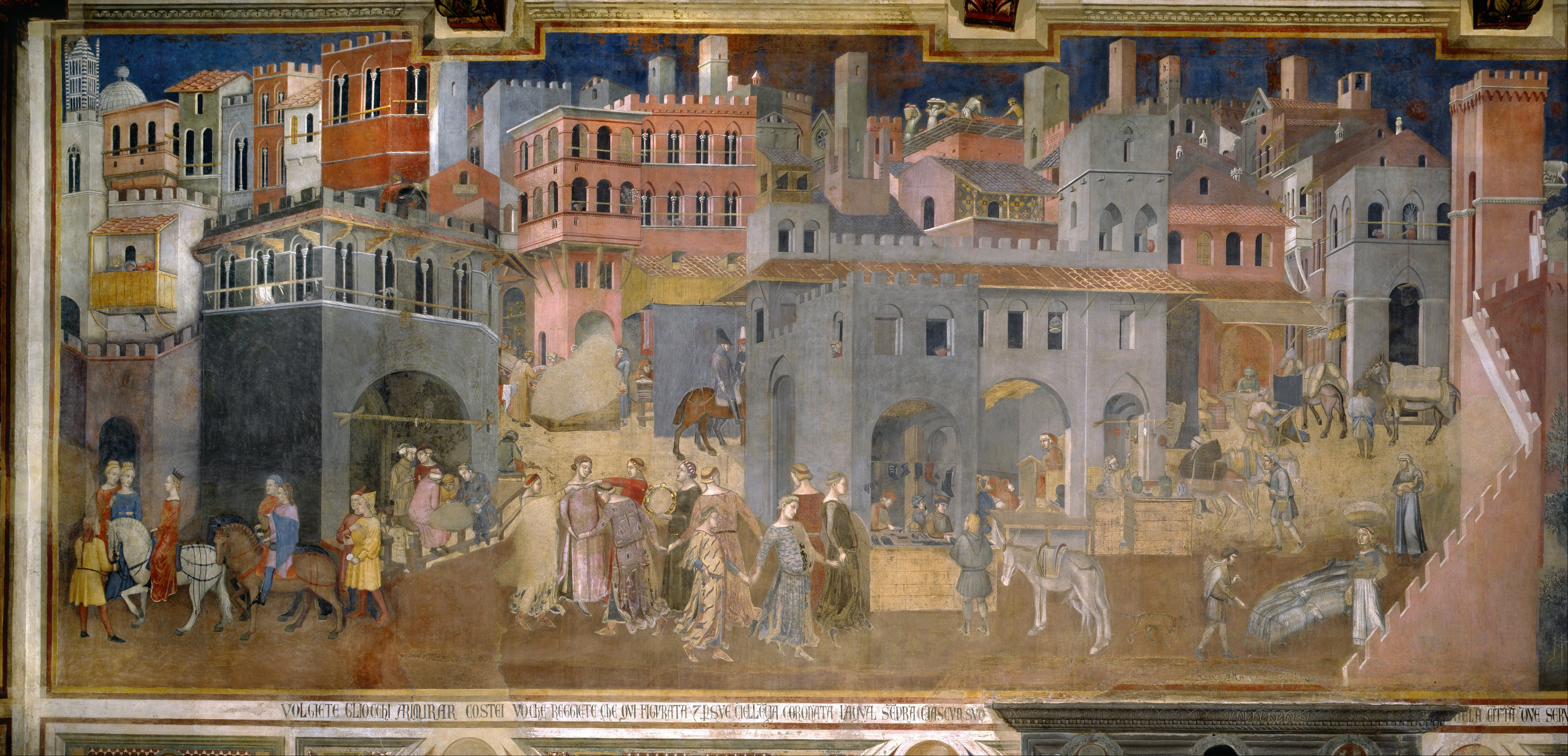
The Effects of Good Government, from Ambrogio Lorenzetti's The Allegory of Good and Bad Government, c. 1338

The Vršac triptych comes across as a large-scale contemporary genre painting to the untrained eye. Drawing parallels with Jovanović's earlier Orientalist works, which she says provide "responses and commentaries", Filipovitch-Robinson notes that the triptych is far from a simple vignette of everyday life. In describing it as a "type of history painting", she argues that it was intended as more than a mere documentary piece. Jovanović's decision to use the triptych format would have been highly unusual otherwise.

Filipovitch-Robinson notes parallels between the Vršac triptych and 14th-century Sienese paintings, specifically Ambrogio Lorenzetti's The Allegory of Good and Bad Government (1338) and his brother Pietro's tempera triptych Birth of the Virgin (1342). Jovanović's work shares its secular subject matter and homage to a city with the former and its triptych format with the latter. However, unlike his medieval counterparts, Jovanović had full freedom of artistic expression while painting the triptych and was not bound by the dictates of wealthy patrons. Filipovitch-Robinson writes that Jovanović was merely reiterating the message of Ambrogio Lorenzetti and applying it to his own time, asserting that Vršac – much like 14th-century Siena – owed its peace and prosperity to the maintenance of traditional values and the merits of good governance. Such an interpretation suggests Jovanović was commending the Austro-Hungarians for bringing stability to his hometown and its surroundings.

Jovanović's giving prominence to the tall church spire on the left panel, Filipovitch-Robinson writes, suggests that the artist was asserting the importance of faith in securing harmony and prosperity. "The qualities exemplified here", she states, "are reminiscent of values and virtues interwoven in traditional religious paintings in which the most sacred personages and scenes are presented in combination with or even in the guise of ordinary humans and their experiences". Though confined to the artist's hometown, the triptych had implications for the wider region as well. "Jovanović ... provides assurance that peace and harmony are not only possible but exist in the contemporary Balkan world, in the town of Vršac." This, she writes, is evidenced by the artist's decision not to focus on members of any particular ethnic group. Rather, Jovanović depicts all the town's inhabitants intermingling with ease. Such a depiction was intended to counter claims of animosity between the locals, despite a past marred by inter-ethnic and inter-religious violence. Filipovitch-Robinson describes the painting as an optimistic work and draws parallels between it and Jovanović's subsequent historical compositions, particularly The Proclamation of Dušan's Law Codex (1900), which she argues were intended to remind Jovanović's compatriots of their rich past and assure them of a bright future.

== Reception and legacy ==
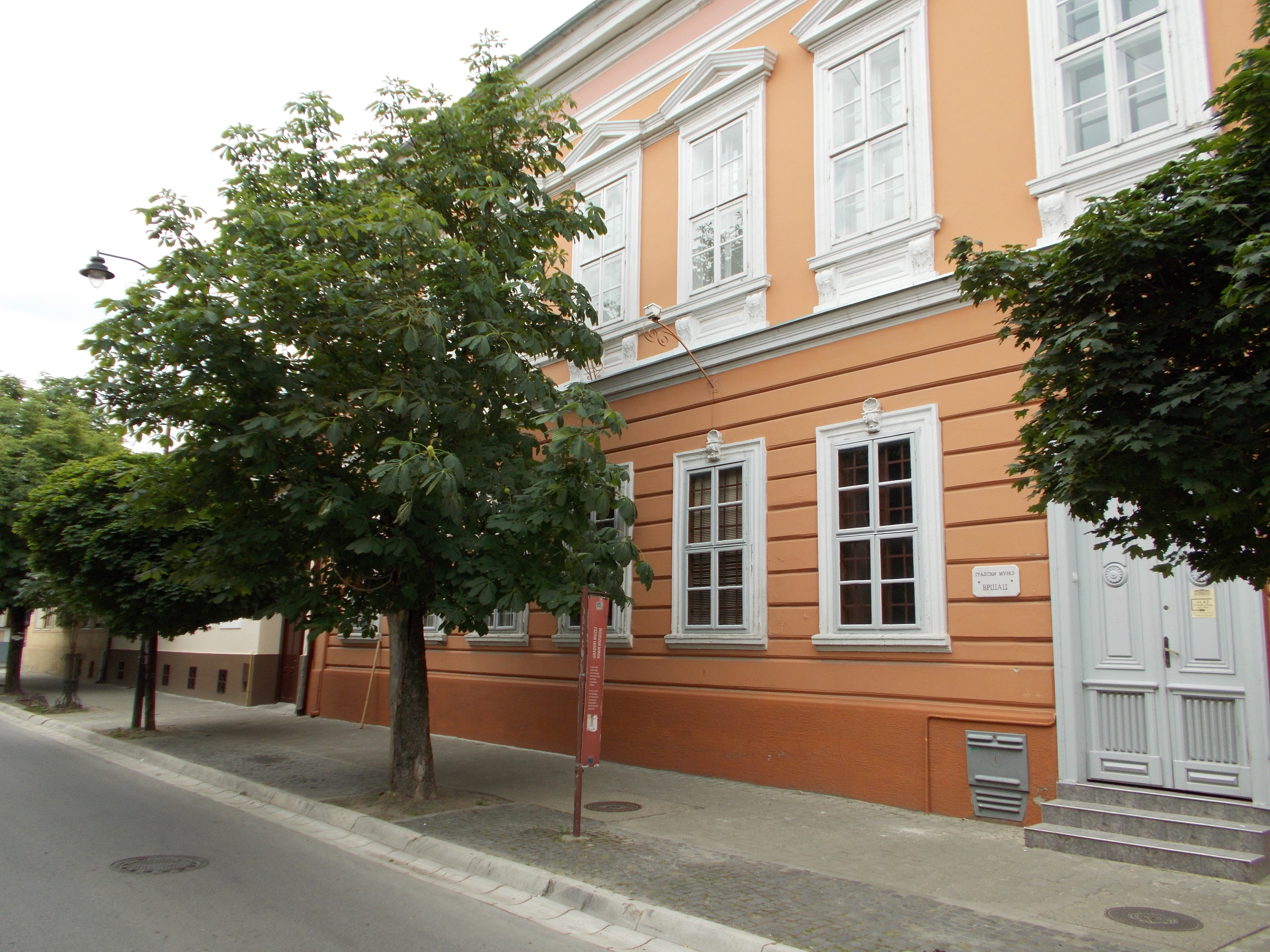
Vršac City Museum

Though intended to be displayed alongside Migration of the Serbs, the triptych ended up being the only painting Jovanović sent to Budapest. The Patriarch of Karlovci, Georgije I, was dissatisfied with Migration of the Serbs at first viewing and demanded that the artist make changes so the painting would conform with the Church's view of the migration. Jovanović duly took the painting back to his studio and began altering it to the Patriarch's liking. Though the changes were made relatively quickly, they could not be rendered in time for the Exhibition. Hence, only the Vršac triptych was sent for display. It was exhibited at the art pavilion and received praise from critics. The artistic committee judged it to be the Exhibition's best work and Jovanović was awarded a gold medal for his efforts. In particular, the judges noted Jovanović's mastery of pleinairism. "Among his friends", one reviewer wrote, "Jovanović is a real master of precise painting. This time, he used plein air and showed so much skill that his paintings could rightfully be set as an example for younger generations."

A travelogue issued in Yugoslavia in the 1920s described the triptych as showing the "solidarity of several nations", an example of the Banat's diversity and cosmopolitanism. "Great artists are never narrow-minded or chauvinists", it continued, "and Jovanović's paintings are a nice example of this". The triptych endures in popularity because it shows Vojvodina's past diversity and cosmopolitanism, which declined significantly during and after World War II, and the subsequent expulsion of the region's ethnic German population. This led one observer to remark on the irony of the triptych celebrating diversity and coexistence in Vršac though descendants of the Germans depicted in the painting are unlikely to be living there today. Nevertheless, the town still has a sizable population of Romanians and Hungarians, according to the 2011 Serbian census. In 1896, the triptych was gifted to the Vršac City Museum by the artist, where it remains on display. It is catalogued under inventory number 168.

== See also ==
- Happy Brothers, another painting of everyday life in Banat
