= Pavle Paja Jovanović =

Serbian painter (1859–1957)

Paja Jovanović
- Паја Јовановић
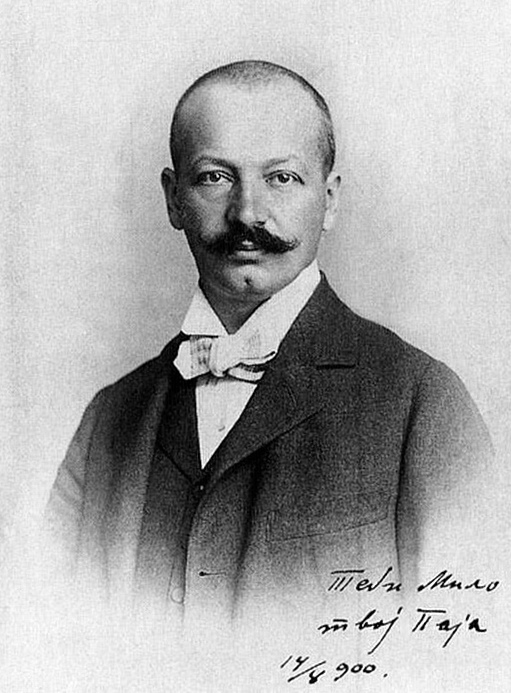
- Pavle "Paja" Jovanović before 1900
- Born: 16 June 1859; Vršac, Austrian Empire
- Died: 30 November 1957 (aged 98); Vienna, Republic of Austria
- Education: Academy of Fine Arts, Vienna
- Known for: Painting
- Notable work: Migration of the Serbs (1896); The Proclamation of Dušan's Law Codex (1900); The Takovo Uprising (1894); The Wounded Montenegrin (1882)
- Movement: Realism
- Website: www.pajajovanovic.rs

Pavle "Paja" Jovanović (Serbian Cyrillic: Павле "Паја" Јовановић; IPA: [pâʋlɛ pǎːja jɔʋǎːnɔʋit͡ɕ]; 16 June 1859 – 30 November 1957) was a Serbian realist painter. Jovanović painted more than 1,100 works including: The Wounded Montenegrin (1882), Decorating of the Bride (1886), The Takovo Uprising (1894), Migration of the Serbs (1896) and The Proclamation of Dušan's Law Codex (1900). As one of the best European painters of oriental scenes, Paja at the end of the 19th century turned to painting historical events of Serbian history. Paja was also the premier portraitist of Europe after 1905. He painted the Emperor Franz Joseph I of Austria 15 times. He painted royalty, major industrialists, scientists, bankers, oil barons and monopolists, including certain heirs to the Standard Oil fortune in the United States. He was a very sought-after portraitist world-wide, which made him incredibly wealthy in his lifetime. Many European and international museums carry his works, signed under various names including: Paul Joanowitch in the National Gallery of Victoria and also two portraits in the Utah Museum of Fine Arts, Paul Joanowits, Paul Ivanovitch, Paul Joanovitch, Paul Joanovitsch, P. Joanowitsch and others.

== Biography ==
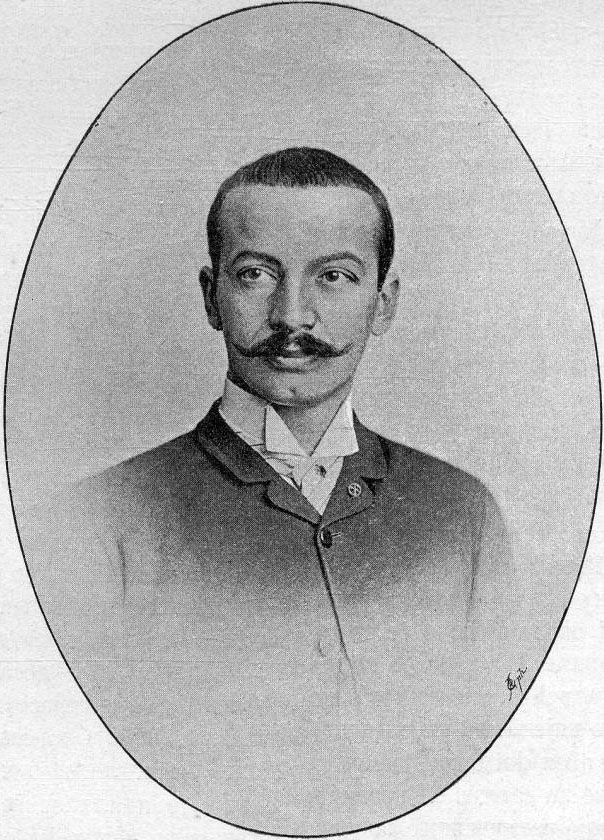
A young Paja Jovanović (1899)

Paja Jovanović was born in Vršac, Austrian Empire (modern-day Serbia). His father was photographer Stevan Jovanović and his mother was Ernestina née Deot, of French descent. He spent his childhood and early youth in this home town, where he saw the iconostasis of Pavel Đurković and Arsenije Teodorović in the town churches, which would influence his future works. So Paja Jovanović started drawing himself, at first in secret, copying church pictures and spending hours in the empty church that he considered his first teacher. However, at the time when the ecclesiastical municipality in Vršac decided to order new bells for the cathedral and when it was necessary to create drawings of saints, it became known about his talent. Thus, already at the age of fourteen, Jovanović received his first commission, and, thanks to significant praise, a kind of pass to Vienna and the opportunity to enroll in the academy.

Jovanović's mother died at a young age and his father went on to remarry. He received his first art lectures and knowledge from his teacher Vodecki. His father took him to Vienna in 1875 when he was 15, where he enrolled in the Academy of Fine Arts in 1877 in the class of professor Christian Griepenkerl. He finished the academy in 1880, attending several important courses taught by Leopold Carl Müller, known as an "orientalist". There is no doubt that Miller's crucial lessons determined his painting preference. Noting the increased interest of Europe to the events in the Balkans, he travelled during the holidays to Albania, Montenegro, Dalmatia, Bosnia and Herzegovina, and Serbia gathering sketches and studies of the life of the Balkan peoples. Precisely these themes brought Paja Jovanović worldwide fame and popularity. In the following period, having noticed the greater interest of Europe for the Balkans, he painted mostly scenes from the life of the Serbs, Montenegrins, Herzogivinans, Aromanians and Albanians, which brought him a great reputation. Encouraged to visit the Balkan region during his hiatus, he studied the customs and folklore of the people, and in 1882 he was awarded the prize of the academy and was given the Imperial scholarship for the composition The Wounded Montenegrin.

The public and many art critics directed their attention to the young painter, and in 1883 he signed a contract with the "French" gallery in London. He continued his travelling through Caucasus, Morocco, Egypt, Greece, Turkey, Italy, and Spain. A great number of sketches, notes, and studies, along with the collected objects from the life of the common people, will find their place in his famous genre-compositions, such as: Fencing, Decorating of the Bride, and Cockfighting. Some of Jovanović's most remarkable praises were gathered at two of his greatest exhibitions: Millennium exhibition in Budapest in 1896, where he prepared Migration of the Serbs for entry, but the Vršac triptych was sent instead, and the World Exhibition in Paris in 1900, for which he had painted a great historical composition The Proclamation of Dušan's Law Codex.

As of 1888, he was proclaimed a member of the Serbian Royal Academy. He was tasked with painting monumental, historical compositions. After 1905 he devoted himself exclusively to painting the portraits in the style of academic realism for the rich clientele, and he became very famous thanks to them. Some of the most famous include those of Painter Simington, Mihajlo Pupin, Đorđe Jovanović, King Alexander I of Yugoslavia and others. He painted the portraits of his longtime model and wife, Muni with special care.

Painting women for Paja Jovanović always meant painting beauty. Even when it was about not so beautiful women, he always tried to find the beauty in them. Many art critics reproached him for this, and sent fierce and even caustic criticisms, but he remained true to himself and his wisdom in life: "Skill is to find beauty."

Jovanović focused mostly on Serbian history, painting various historical events, such as

- The Proclamation of Dušan's Law Codex, codex made by first Serbian Emperor
- Saint Sava reconciling his quarrelling brothers, Sava was monk and a saint who focused on Serbian education and religion
- Migration of the Serbs, Depicting Serbs led by Archbishop Arsenije III, fleeing Old Serbia and moving up north to Austria, Hungary and Vojvodina
- The Wedding of Emperor Stefan Dušan

He painted the iconostasis in the church of St Nicholas in Dolovo and Orthodox cathedral in Novi Sad, which was painted without commission. He spent most of his time in his atelier in Vienna, where he settled, and occasionally travelled to Belgrade. In 1940 he was made honorary citizen of Vršac, and in 1949 he was given the Order zasluga za narod (Merit for People) of the first category. He lived quietly and lonely, after his wife's early death, in Vienna until his own death in 1957. According to his will, the urn with his ashes was to be moved to Belgrade and where Museum of Paja Jovanović was opened in 1970, as well in Vršac. Later, in the building of the Old Pharmacy on the Stairs, in 1977 the permanent commemorative exhibition of Paja Jovanović was opened.

The works of Paja Jovanović have been kept in the Town Museum of Vršac, along with his well-known painting Vršac triptych. Most of his works and personal belongings can be found in the Belgrade City Museum.

Jovanović's memoirs have been published in 2025.

== Benefactor ==
Paja Jovanović was also a member of "Privrednik" Patronage. He remembered after graduating from the Academy of Fine Arts in Vienna, that it was the Matica Srpska that afforded him schooling. He joined Privrednik's work early on, making annual monetary donations and furthermore donating his valuable works of art to the Society.

== Legacy ==
He is included in The 100 most prominent Serbs list. Along with Uroš Predić and Đorđe Krstić, he is considered the most important Serbian painter of realism. Thanks to his extremely rich oeuvre with over 1100 works, especially works with themes from folk life and history, he strongly and widely influenced art education, culture, but also the patriotism of Serbian people. Jovanović received a number of orders and decorations both in Serbia and abroad. A number of schools in Serbia are named after him.

== Awards ==
- The second award, for the composition the Wounded Montenegrin, the final annual exhibition of Department of Historical Painting in 1881
- Gold Medal at the National Exhibition in Vienna in 1898 for the painting Cockfight
- Gold Medal at the World's Fair in Paris in 1900 for the painting The Coronation of Emperor Dušan
- Gold Medal at the International Exhibition of the Vienna Art Society in 1901 for the painting The Wedding of Duke Ferri (or The Wedding of Emperor Stefan Dušan)
- Gold Medal at the Paris Salon in 1902 for the painting Furor Teutonicus
- Order of Merits for the People, 1st class, 1949

== Selected works ==
The Wedding of Emperor Stefan Dušan (1904)

The Fencing lesson (1884)

The Wounded Montenegrin (1882)

The Sword Dance or Fencing Game (1890)

Vršac triptych (1895), Vršac City Museum

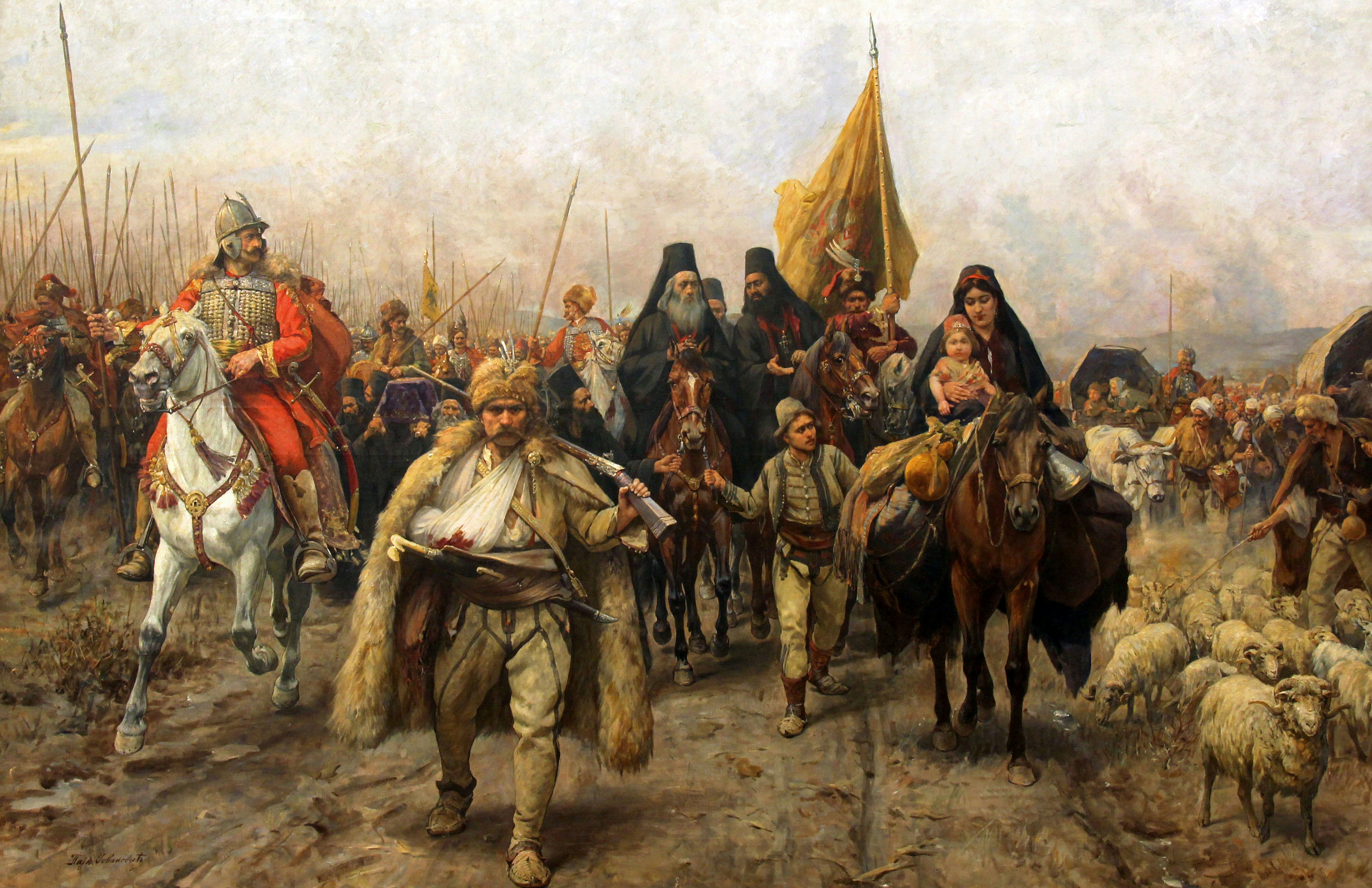
Migration of the Serbs (1896), Pančevo Museum.

Miloš, Marko and the Fairy (1906)

Saint Sava reconciling his quarrelling brothers (1901)

The Proclamation of Dušan's Law Codex (1900).

Furor Teutonicus by Paul Joanovitch The monumental oil painting (24 square meters) made in 1899 describes the Battle of the Teutoburg Forest. It went missing after being in the Chilean National Museum of Fine Arts, though this sketch has survived.

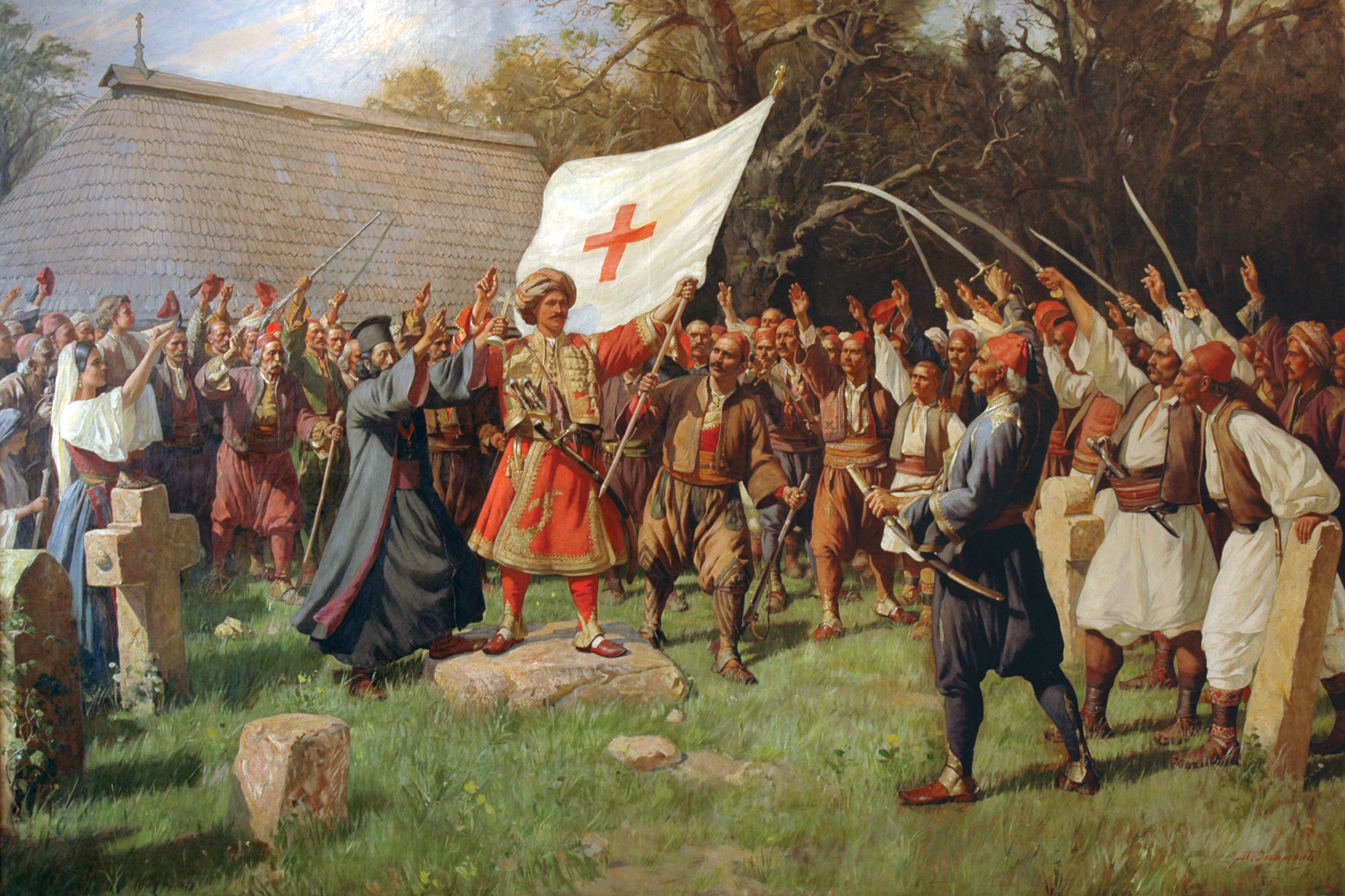
The Takovo Uprising, depicting Miloš Obrenović (1894)

== See also ==
- List of Orientalist artists
- Orientalism
