= The Proclamation of Dušan's Law Codex =

Paintings by Paja Jovanović

- Проглашење Душановог законика (Serbian)
- Artist: Paja Jovanović
- Year: 1900
- Medium: Oil on canvas
- Movement: Historicism, Realism
- Dimensions: 390 cm × 589 cm (154 in × 232 in)
- Location: National Museum of Serbia in Belgrade, Serbia

The Proclamation of Dušan's Law Codex (Serbian: Proglašenje Dušanovog zakonika, Serbian Cyrillic: Проглашење Душановог законика) is the name given to each of seven versions of a composition painted by Paja Jovanović which depict Dušan the Mighty introducing Serbia's earliest surviving law codex to his subjects in Skopje in 1349. The Royal Serbian Government commissioned the first version for 30,000 dinars in 1899, intending for it to be displayed at the following year's Exposition Universelle (world's fair) in Paris.

When originally commissioned, the painting was intended to depict Dušan's 1346 coronation as Emperor of Serbia. After consulting with the politician and historian Stojan Novaković, Jovanović decided against painting a scene from Dušan's coronation, and opted to depict the proclamation of his law codex instead. Thus, the painting has often erroneously been described as depicting the coronation. Jovanović paid a great deal of attention to historical detail in preparation for the work, visiting several medieval Serbian Orthodox monasteries in Kosovo and Macedonia, studying medieval costumes and weaponry and consulting experts on the period.

The first version was finished in time for the world's fair, where it received widespread critical acclaim and was awarded a gold medal by the fair's artistic committee. In the opinion of one art historian, the artistic committee's decision affirmed that the painting was on par with the works of the world's greatest visual artists. A number of historians and critics consider The Proclamation of Dušan's Law Codex to be one of Jovanović's finest works, and Jovanović himself felt the painting was his "most beautiful composition".

== Dušan's Code ==
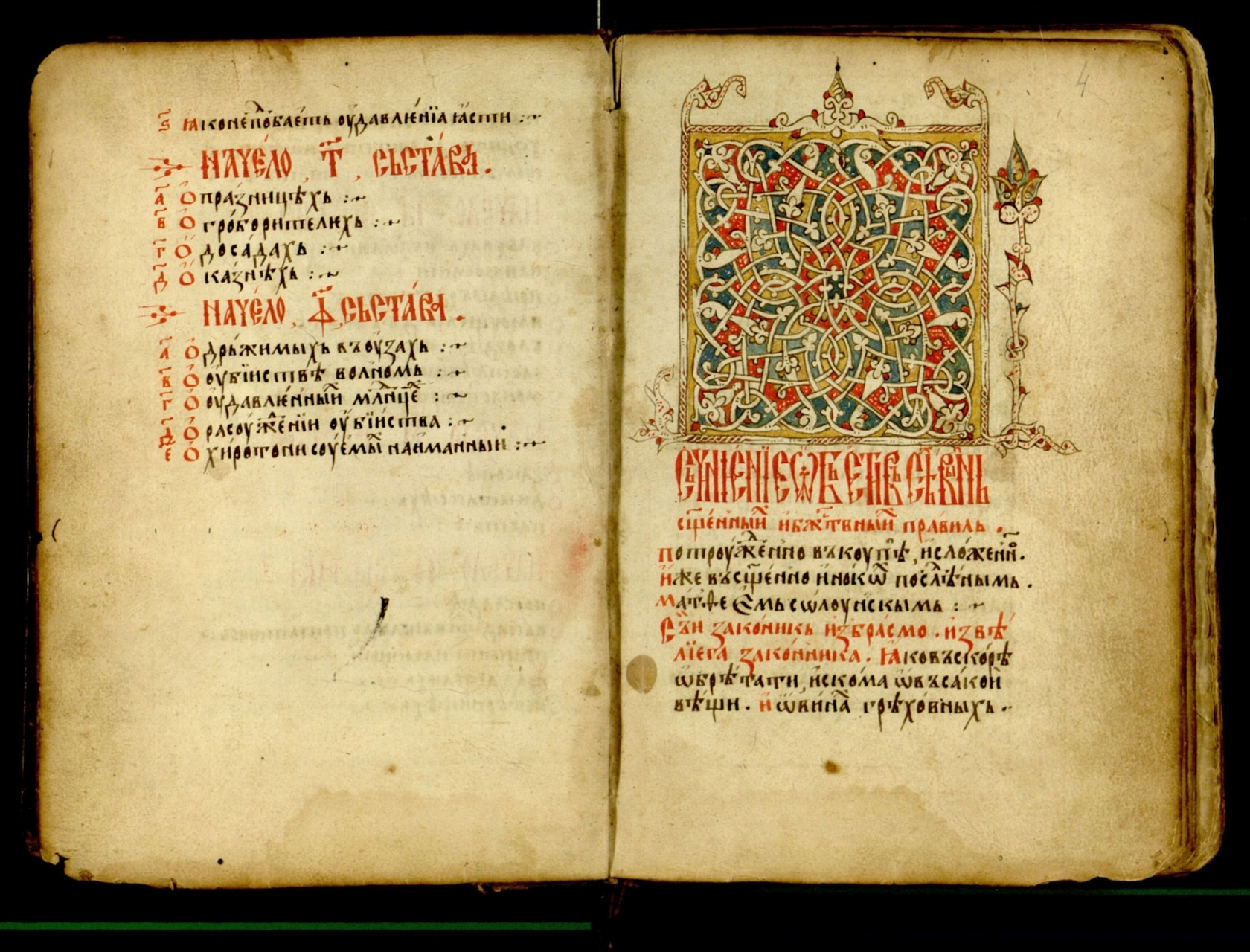
The Prizren Manuscript of Dušan's Code

Stefan Dušan was one of Serbia's most powerful rulers. In the mid-14th century, he oversaw the establishment of a large Serbian state that stretched from the Danube to the Greek mainland. As a result of his achievements, in Serbian historiography he is referred to as Dušan the Mighty or Dušan the Lawgiver. The first suffix is in recognition of his expansion of Serbia's territory and the second in recognition of the law codex he introduced during his reign, commonly called Dušan's Code. In 1343, as King of Serbs and the Coast, Dušan added "King of the Romans" to his title. (Note: In this case, "Romans" refers to the Byzantine Greeks. This is due to the fact that the Byzantine Greeks identified themselves as Romans.) In late 1345, he began referring to himself as the Emperor (tsar) of Serbia. On Easter Day, 16 April 1346, Dušan convoked an assembly in Skopje, attended by the Serbian Archbishop Joanikije II, the Archbishop of Ochrid Nikolaj I, the Bulgarian Patriarch Simeon and various religious leaders from Mount Athos. The assembly then ceremonially performed the raising of the autocephalous Serbian Archbishopric to the status of Patriarchate. (Note: This change was met with condemnation by the Patriarchate of Constantinople. Knowing the Byzantines were likely to oppose such a move, Dušan felt that having a large number of Eastern Orthodox religious leaders in attendance would give the establishment of the Serbian Patriarchate added legitimacy. By 1350, the Patriarchate of Constantinople had excommunicated both Dušan and Joanikije.) From then on, the Archbishop was titled the Serbian Patriarch, with his seat in Patriarchal Monastery of Peć. Dušan was subsequently crowned Emperor of Serbia by the new Patriarch, Joanikije. (Note: This was not universally recognized, and in the histories of the Byzantine Emperor John VI, he continued to be referred to as the King of Serbia.)

Dušan had ambitions of conquering all the Byzantine lands, including Constantinople, and proclaiming himself Byzantine Emperor. In order to achieve this goal, he knew that he needed to secure the loyalty of his Greek subjects. Thus, Dušan decreed that lands inhabited by Greeks were to have Greek governors and follow traditional Byzantine laws as opposed to Serbian customary law. This had the effect of reducing tensions between Serbs and Greeks and made it easier for the Serbs to occupy Greek lands without any considerable threat of revolt. In 1349, Dušan issued a national legal code from his capital, Skopje, one that applied only to the northern half of the empire where Serbs predominated. Dušan's Code is Serbia's earliest surviving legal code; it was influenced heavily by Byzantine law. It was also one of the most advanced legal texts of its time, and the first wide-ranging set of laws promulgated by the South Slavs. Because it only covers specific crimes, it was likely part of a three-part legal document that also included an abridgement of Matthew Blastares' Syntagma and the Law of Justinian. The third part, Dušan's Code itself, was thus probably intended to supplement the first two texts by touching upon issues not covered in them rather than serve as a stand-alone legal system.

== The painting ==
=== Preparation and composition ===
Detail showing Dušan emerging from the church, flanked by his wife and young son, as his law codex is proclaimed to the people

In the late 1890s, Serbia was invited to participate at the 1900 Exposition Universelle (world's fair) in Paris. In 1897, the Royal Serbian Government created a special committee to select which Serbs would go to France as representatives of their country; the committee was chaired by the politician Svetozar Gvozdić. It was decided that Serbia's contribution to the fair would predominantly consist of art, most of which was to be displayed at the Serbian Pavilion, a building in the Serbo-Byzantine style designed by the architect Milan Kapetanović. Other Serbian works were to be displayed at the Grand Palais. The rules of the fair's art exhibit held that each canvas had to measure 390 by 589 centimetres (154 by 232 in) and contain over seventy figures in various, often complex, positions.

In Serbia, the period between 1889 and 1914 was marked by a spate of patriotic literature, theatre and visual art. Serbian artists competed with one another over who would produce the best depictions of Serbia's medieval history, and the best Serbian national romantic art was made during this time. One of the most prominent Serb artists of the day was the realist Paja Jovanović, who was known for his sprawling historical works. In 1899, the special committee hired him to compose a scene depicting Dušan's coronation to be displayed in Paris. (Note: The works of other Serbian artists were also displayed at the fair, such as Đorđe Krstić's The Fall of Stalać.) In return for his services, he received an honorarium of 30,000 dinars. The government felt it was essential that Jovanović's work and those of other Serbian artists be well received. Given decades of political instability in the Balkans, the authorities sought to promote a positive image of their country abroad, especially by familiarizing Western Europeans with Serbian art. Hence, Jovanović was painting for a dual audience, both domestic and foreign. His foremost goal was to emphasize the legitimacy of Serbia's contemporary territorial claims before the Great Powers, especially with regard to Kosovo, Macedonia and the Sandžak (then divided between the Ottoman Empire and Austria-Hungary), and counter any negative views of the Serbian state. For his domestic audience, Jovanović's goal was to remind his countrymen of Serbia's rich history and encourage patriotic sentiments. After consulting with the politician and historian Stojan Novaković, Jovanović decided against painting a scene from Dušan's coronation, and opted to depict the proclamation of Dušan's Code instead. As a result, the painting is sometimes mistakenly referred to as The Coronation of Tsar Dušan (Serbian: Krunisanje Cara Dušana).

Jovanović began working on the painting in 1900. In keeping with his usual approach, he spent a significant amount of time researching Dušan's life. He read medieval accounts of the proclamation, consulted experts on that historical period, and examined medieval paintings and illuminated manuscripts for insight into the architecture and weaponry of 14th-century Serbia. Jovanović also visited the monasteries of Gračanica and Lesnovo, the Field of Kosovo, and the cities of Prizren and Skopje. Since the church where the proclamation took place had long since been destroyed, he was forced to find an alternative, ultimately deciding to model it after the Visoki Dečani monastery given the similarities in their design. By his own admission, the hardest task Jovanović faced was achieving authenticity with regard to clothing, weaponry and medieval heraldry. He found the medieval clothing particularly difficult to reproduce because Serbs did not have their own national costume at the time. Instead, medieval Serbs, especially royalty and the nobility, wore clothing that was greatly influenced by neighbouring cultures, particularly the Byzantines. Jovanović styled the clothes seen in the painting on frescoes from the medieval monasteries he visited, sketched them, and then requested that the head costume designer of the Vienna State Opera recreate them based on those sketches. Upon receiving the costumes, Jovanović placed them in his studio and used them as models for the painting. Dušan's German mercenaries, who are shown lining the church doors church as he exits, wear Venetian body armour. Jovanović based this detail on a medieval correspondence that Novaković had discovered in the Venetian archives where Dušan is recorded having ordered 300 units of plate armour from Venice. Knights' swords and other weaponry were based on depictions from medieval frescoes. The heraldry depicted on the shields and the insignia of the various figures is based on examples from a medieval book titled Armaila Illyricorum. Jovanović had found the book in a Viennese library. It had been removed from Herzegovina's Žitomislić monastery several decades prior and brought to the Austro-Hungarian capital. The Proclamation of Dušan's Law Codex was painted outdoors, en plein air.

=== Description and history ===
Palman Bracht, a German knight in Dušan's service (left) and Gojko Mrnjavčević reading the proclamation (right)

The painting depicts Dušan exiting a church with his wife, Jelena, and son, Uroš, shortly after announcing that the law codex would be put into force. At their side are Patriarch Joanikije and the magnate Jovan Oliver, as well as many other members of the clergy and nobility. The emperor and his entourage are watched by an admiring crowd of nobles, knights and commoners. The knights lower their swords at Dušan's feet as a sign of respect and submission. A festive atmosphere pervades the scene. The noble Gojko Mrnjavčević reads the proclamation before the crowd. Palman Bracht, a German mercenary who oversaw Dušan's personal bodyguard, stands at the far right among a row of other knights, and watches closely as the Emperor steps outside. The art historian Lilien Filipovitch-Robinson writes:

Technically, the artist brought together an accumulation of his considerable study and experience as a painter of history, portrait, and genre scenes. As was typical, his orderly composition and perfect one-point linear perspective, both of which are appropriate to the subject, are informed by the frescoes of the Renaissance. Every figure in the foreground and middle ground directs the eye steadily to the compositional vanishing point, Tsar Dušan. He is the epitome of control, dignity, and majesty. The brilliantly clothed entourage behind him frames his form as do the massive stone walls of the church. They not only lend compositional stability but intimate a durability shared by the God-inspired architecture and Dušan’s reign.

Once complete, the painting was presented to the Royal Serbian Government. As part of his contract, Jovanović granted the government the right to print reproductions of the painting. Jovanović felt the painting was his "most beautiful composition", but was displeased that he had not been able to complete it the way it was originally envisaged. He had originally intended for the finished work to be painted on woven tapestry. The version that went on display in Paris was an oil on canvas that Jovanović had only meant to use as a model for the tapestry painting. He later recalled that King Alexander had gambled away the money he had promised to provide for the tapestry painting's completion. Disappointed, Jovanović pledged to repaint it to his own liking, though he did not begin work on a revision until 1925–26, by which time he was in his sixties. He went on to complete a total of seven different versions of the painting in his lifetime. The first version is in the possession of the National Museum of Serbia, in Belgrade. After a lengthy restoration process, it was unveiled to the public in February 2022. Another, measuring 190 by 126 centimetres (75 by 50 in), is on permanent display at the Belgrade City Museum.

== Critical reception and legacy ==
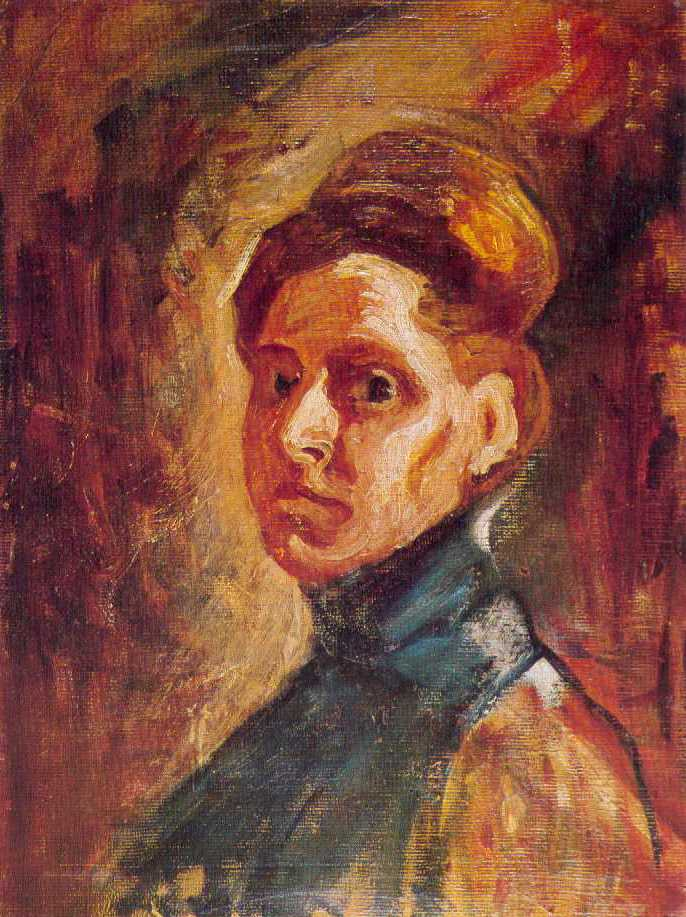
The painter and art critic Nadežda Petrović described the painting as Jovanović's greatest work

The Proclamation of Dušan's Law Codex was well received by the Serbian public, and is said to have exceeded the expectations of all the government ministers. It was also well received in France, where Jovanović was named an Officer of the Académie des Beaux-Arts. The painting was met with critical acclaim at the world's fair, and the fair's artistic committee awarded Jovanović a gold medal for his work. By way of this decision, the art historian Jelena Milojković-Djurić asserts, the Paris committee recognized that the painting was on par with those of the world's best visual artists.

Serbian painter and art critic Nadežda Petrović described Jovanović's compositions as the "crown of Serbian pictorial art", and lauded The Proclamation of Dušan's Law Codex as his best work. Filipovitch-Robinson ranks it among Jovanović's three best paintings, alongside The Takovo Uprising (1888) and Migration of the Serbs (1896). "By focusing on the famed reign of Tsar Dušan," she writes, "Jovanović was making a case for the respect with which Serbia should be regarded." The painting, she argues, is both a history lesson and a "patriotic declaration". For Serbian audiences in particular, she continues, it alluded to the greatness of Serbia's past and implied that the country's restoration as a free, modern nation was within reach. In her opinion, it is an inherently optimistic work.

Tim Judah, a journalist specializing in the Balkans, compares Jovanović's contribution to Serbian art to Jacques-Louis David's contribution to French art, and draws parallels between The Proclamation of Dušan's Law Codex and The Coronation of Napoleon. Professor David A. Norris, a historian specializing in Serbian culture, describes the knights' armour as "highly stylized" and opines that, as a direct result, some of the figures resemble Hollywood actors more than medieval knights. "The picture shows excellent conception and solidity in its composition," art historian Radmila Antić contends. "The figures are well related, their attitudes conscientiously studied, the costumes represented with the greatest care for detail."
