= Historical Archives of Zrenjanin =

- Историјски архив Зрењанин (Serbian); Nagybecskereki Történelmi Levéltár (Hungarian); Arhiva Istorică a Zrenjaninului (Romanian); Historický archív Zrenjanin (Slovak)

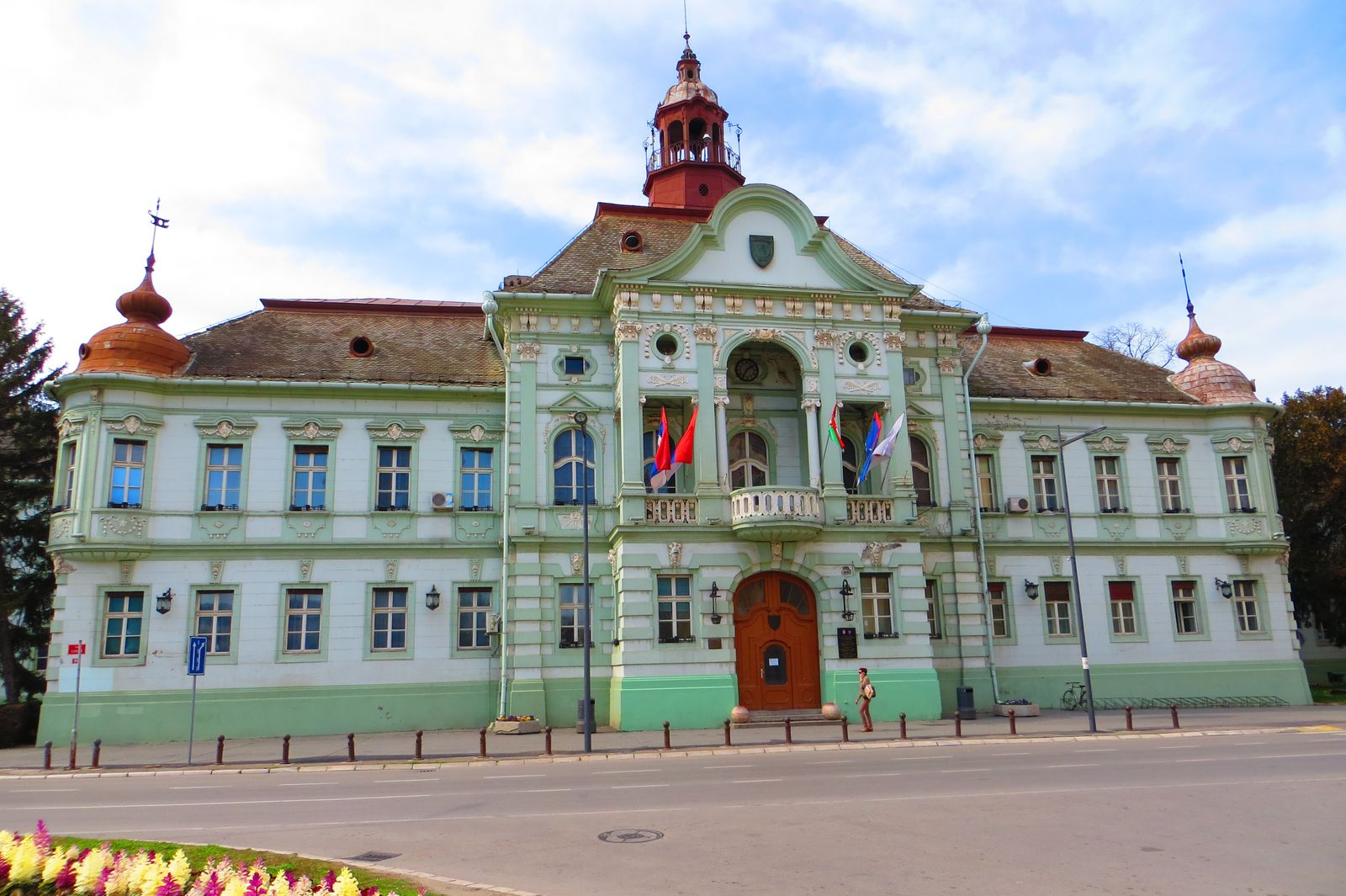
- Zrenjanin City Hall houses the archives

Agency overview
- Formed: 1947
- Jurisdiction: Government of Serbia
- Headquarters: Trg slobode 10, Zrenjanin, Vojvodina, Serbia
- Parent agency: Archives of Vojvodina
- Website: Official website

Map
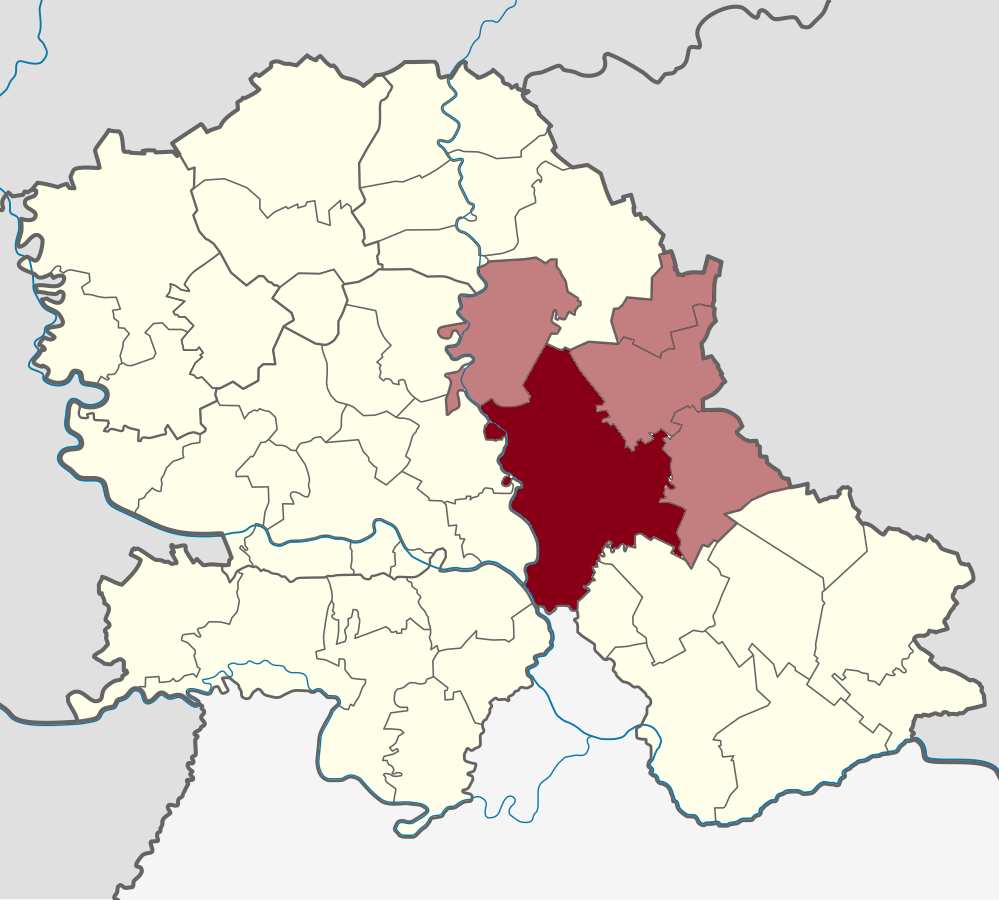
- Area served by the archives shown on the map of Vojvodina, Serbia

The Historical Archives of Zrenjanin (Serbian: Историјски архив Зрењанин, Hungarian: Nagybecskereki Történelmi Levéltár, Romanian: Arhiva Istorică a Zrenjaninului, Slovak: Historický archív Zrenjanin) are the primary institution responsible for preservation of archival materials in the Central Banat District located in Zrenjanin, Vojvodina, Serbia.

== Background ==
The archives were established at the Zrenjanin Court House on September 1, 1947, and in 1952 they were moved to the Zrenjanin City Hall where they remain until today.

The archives preserve 774 collections and funds, totaling approximately five thousand meters of archival material, dating from 1765 to 2016. Based on the categorization performed in 1998, 67 collections from the period between 1765 and 1956 were declared cultural heritage of exceptional importance, and 66 collections from the period between 1769 and 1970 were declared of great importance.

The prominent role in the establishment of the institution was played by Toma Rajić. The archives were established as the Archival Centre No. 4 by the decision of the authorities of the Socialist Autonomous Province of Vojvodina. Between 1954 and 1957 the archives published Arhivska građa edition aimed at facilitating research work in addition to internal catalogues. The current name of the institution was introduced in 1965. The archives are under the direct supervision of the Archives of Vojvodina which serve as the central archival institution in Vojvodina.

== Directors ==
- Timotije Rajić (1947–1953)
- Jovan Jagodić, Pavle Zubković, Imre Has (1953 – 1954)
- Milan Tutorov (1 September 1954 – 1 February 1964)
- Milan Đukanov (1 February 1964 – 1 April 1964, acting; 1 April 1964 – 31 December 1980)
- Tihomir Savić (1 January 1981 – 23 January 1983)
- Blagoje Jovanov (1983 – 1992)
- Milan Đukanov (1992 – 23 January 2001)
- Nada Boroš (23 January 2001 – 1 March 2014)
- Ružica Cvetić (1 March 2014 – 13 September 2016)
- Mirjana Basta (13 September 2016 – )

== See also ==
- List of archives in Serbia
- State Archives of Serbia
- Archives of Vojvodina
- Historical Archives "Syrmia" of Sremska Mitrovica
- Archives of Sremski Karlovci
- National Museum of Zrenjanin
