= Historical Archives of Belgrade =

Archives in Serbia

- Историјски архив Београда

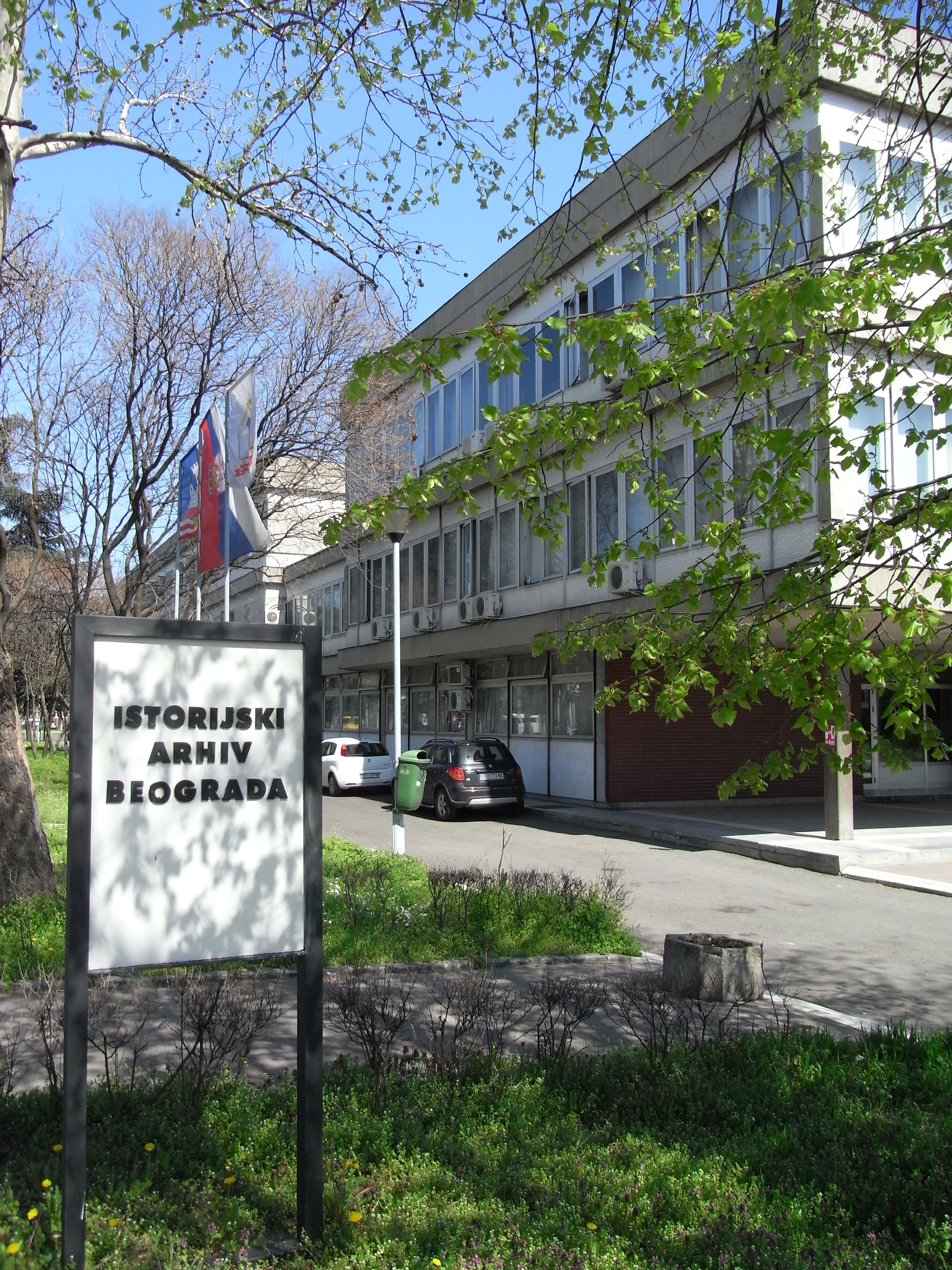

Agency overview
- Formed: 1945
- Jurisdiction: City Assembly of Belgrade
- Headquarters: Belgrade, Serbia; 44.8256°N 20.4135°E
- Parent agency: State Archives of Serbia
- Website: Official website

Map
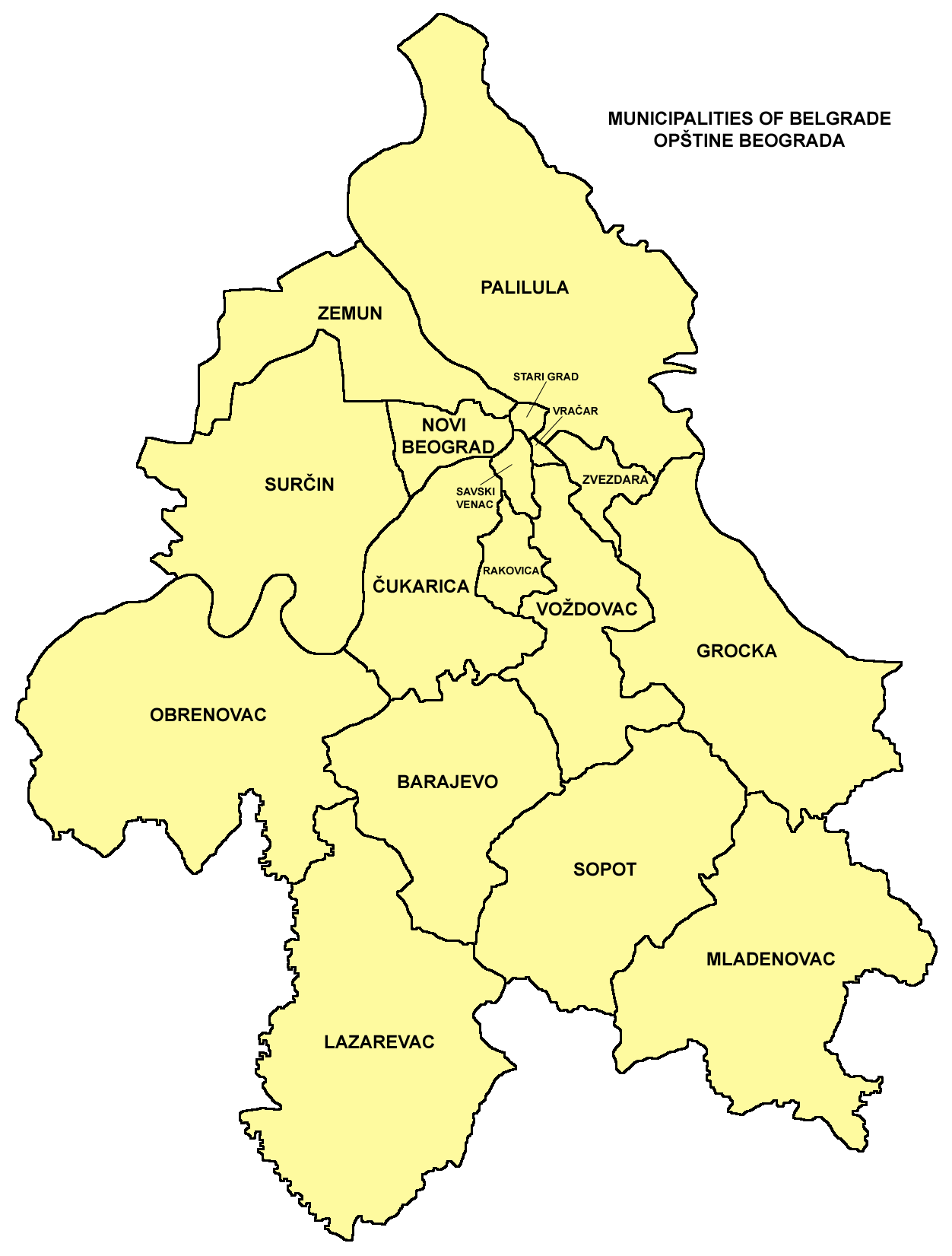
- Municipalities of Belgrade, area served by the Historical Archives of Belgrade

The Historical Archives of Belgrade (Serbian: Историјски архив Београда, romanized: Istorijski arhiv Beograda) are the primary institution responsible for preservation of archival materials in the city of Belgrade, capital of Serbia. The Archives collect documents from all 17 municipalities of Belgrade, spanning from the mid-18th century to the end of the 20th century. The institution was established by a decision of the Executive Committee of the People's Committee of the City of Belgrade of the People's Republic of Serbia in September 1945. The Archives preserve 2,580 fonds, totaling 13,000 linear meters of archival materials. This collection includes records from personal and family collections, as well as various societies, associations, and cultural organizations. It also includes records from educational institutions, healthcare, industry, the judiciary, administrative bodies, and government agencies.

The most extensive fonds include records from the City Assembly of Belgrade, the District Court of Belgrade, the City Administration of Belgrade, the Zemunski Magistrat, the District Court in Zemun, and the Belgrade Chamber of Commerce. The archival materials are predominantly in Serbian and German, with individual documents in Turkish, French, Hungarian, Russian, Italian, Romanian, Hebrew, and other languages. The building of the archive was reconstructed in 2002.

== See also ==
- List of archives in Serbia
- State Archives of Serbia
- Archives of Vojvodina
- Historical Archive of Srem
- Archives of Sremski Karlovci
