= Historical Archives of Sombor =

- Историјски архив Сомбор (Serbian); Sombori Történeti Levéltár (Hungarian)

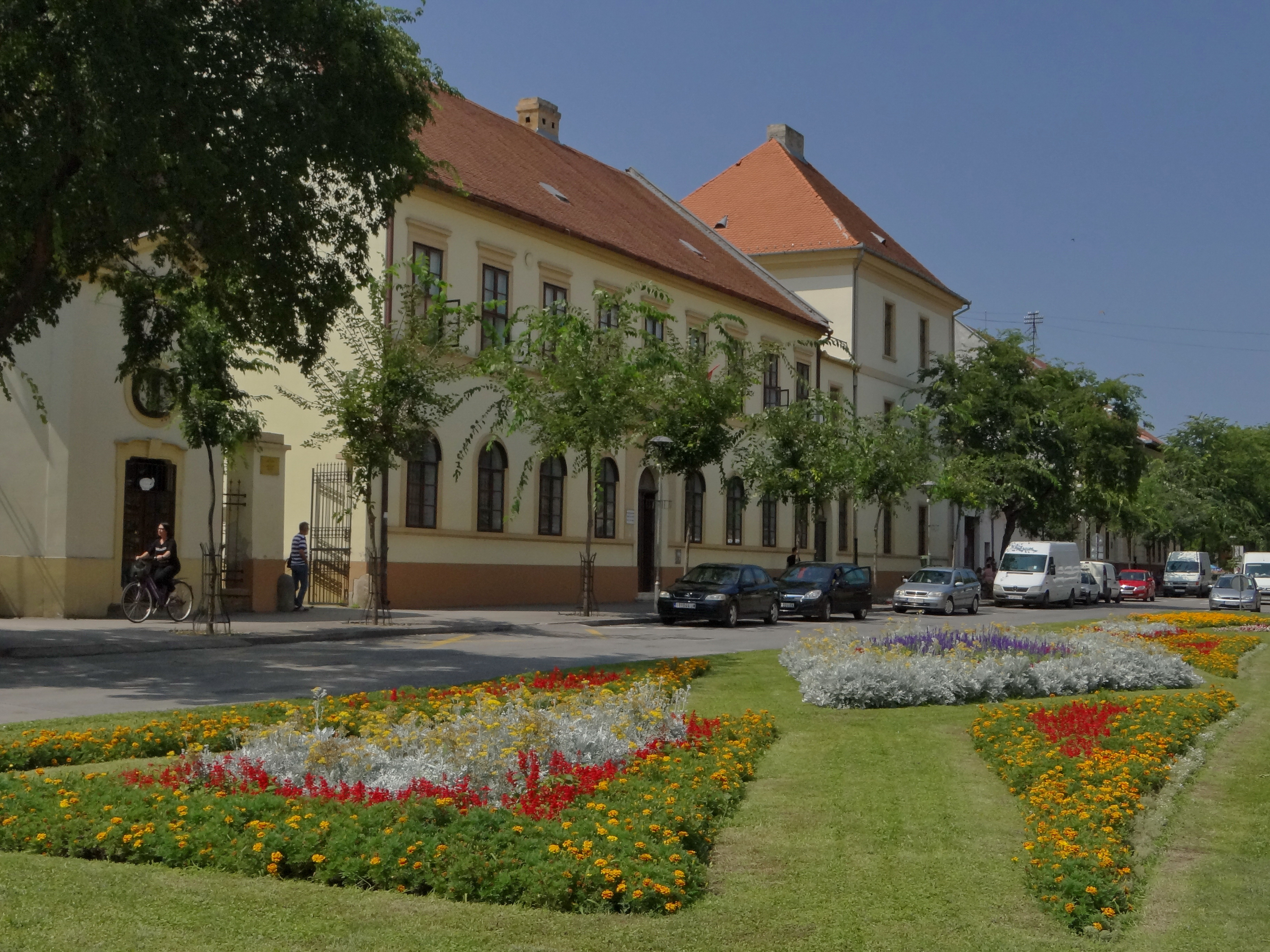
- Building housing the archives

Agency overview
- Formed: 1948; 78 years ago
- Jurisdiction: Government of Serbia
- Headquarters: Sombor, Vojvodina, Serbia; 45°46′23″N 19°06′46″E
- Parent agency: Archives of Vojvodina
- Website: Official website

Map
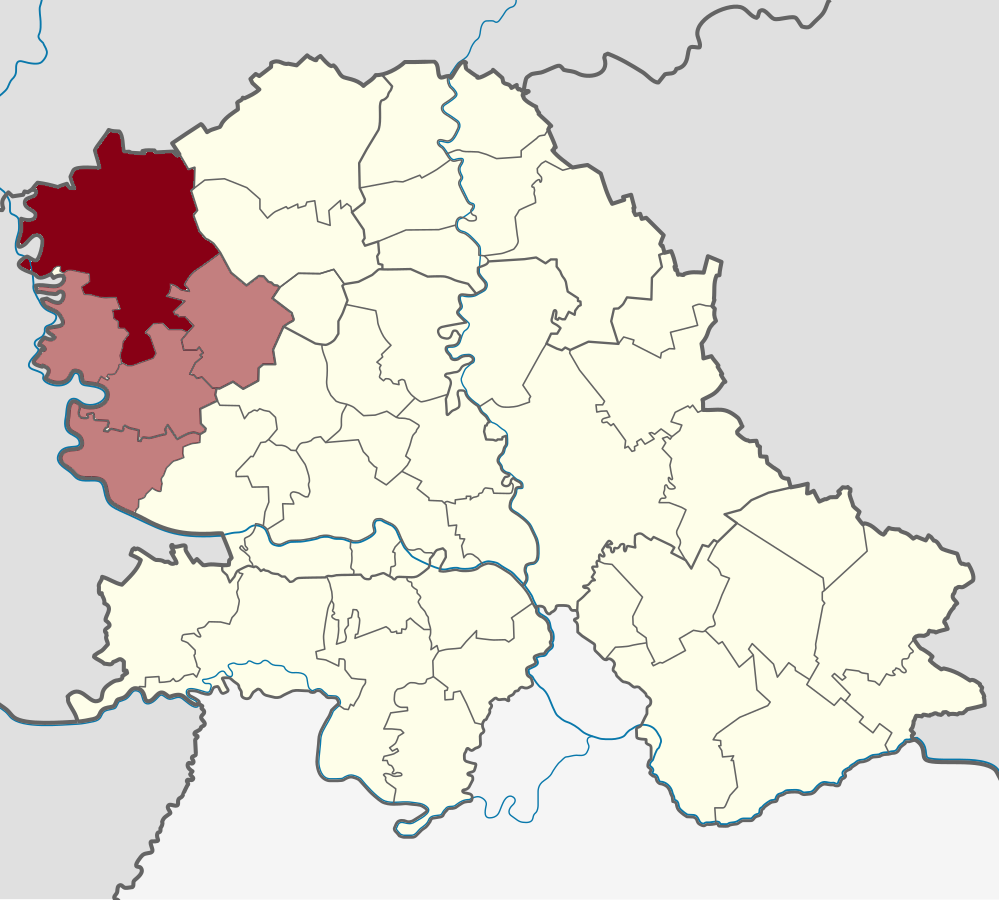
- Area served by the archives shown on the map of Vojvodina, Serbia

The Historical Archives of Sombor (Serbian: Историјски архив Сомбор, Hungarian: Sombori Történeti Levéltár) are the primary institution responsible for preservation of archival materials in the West Bačka District and westernmost parts of South Bačka District located in Sombor, Vojvodina, Serbia. They are the primary archival institution for the municipalities of Sombor, Apatin, Kula, Odžaci, and Bač. The archives were established as the regional archival centre in the Autonomous Province of Vojvodina in 1948 and today it houses 558 fonds and collections. They gained independent institution status in 1951 by the decision of the City of Sombor.

== See also ==
- List of archives in Serbia
- State Archives of Serbia
- Archives of Vojvodina
- Sombor City Museum
