= Historical Archives of Subotica =

- Историјски архив Суботица (Serbian); Szabadkai Történelmi Levéltár (Hungarian); Povijesni arhiv Subotica (Croatian)

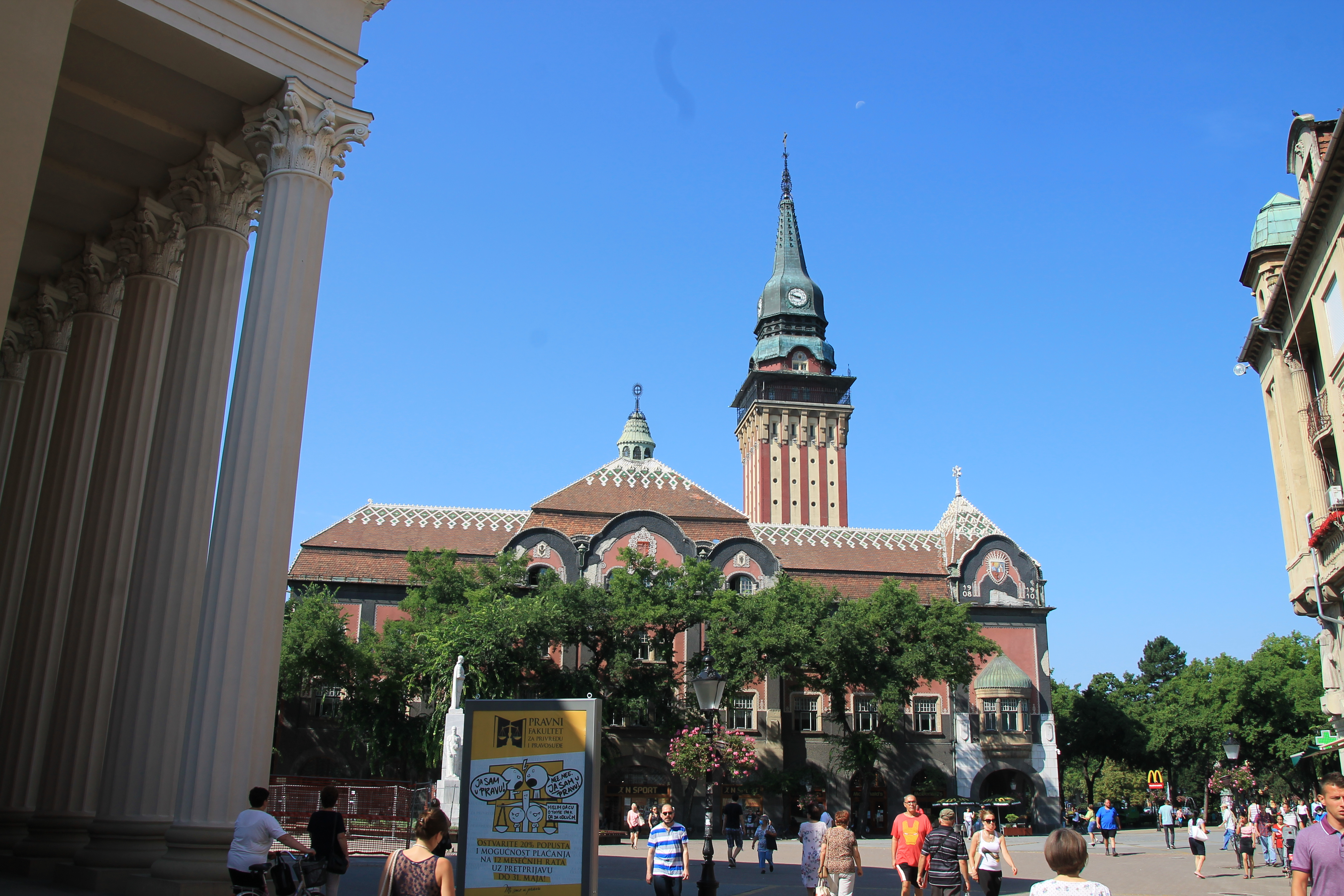
- Subotica City Hall building housing the archives and other local institutions

Agency overview
- Formed: 1946; 80 years ago
- Jurisdiction: Government of Serbia
- Headquarters: Trg Slobode 1/III, Subotica, Vojvodina, Serbia; 46.0996°N 19.6647°E
- Parent agency: Archives of Vojvodina
- Website: Official website

Map
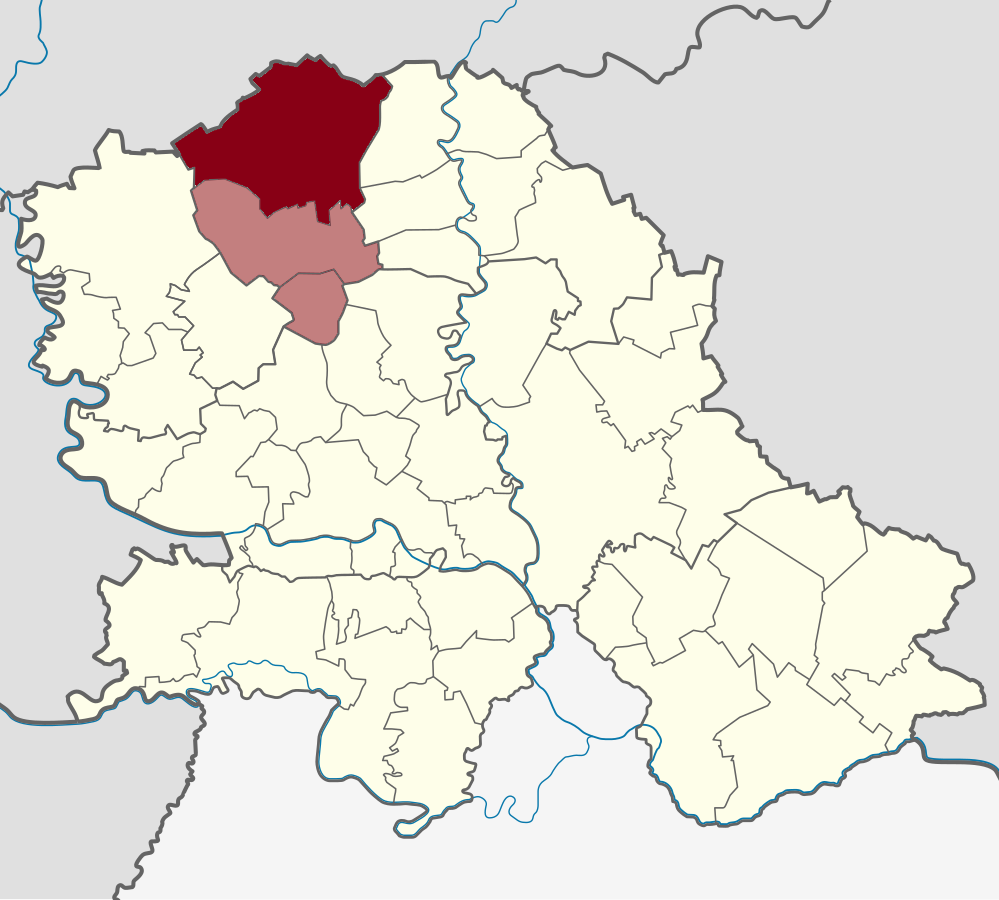
- Area served by the archives shown on the map of Vojvodina, Serbia

The Historical Archives of Subotica (Serbian: Историјски архив Суботица, Hungarian: Szabadkai Történelmi Levéltár, Croatian: Povijesni arhiv Subotica) are the primary institution responsible for preservation of archival materials in the North Bačka District located in Subotica, Vojvodina, Serbia. They are the primary archival institution for the municipalities of Subotica, Bačka Topola, and Mali Iđoš. The archive holds 484 fonds and collections which contains 6 535, 77 shelf meters of archival materials.

== History ==
The establishment of the archives in Subotica has a long and significant history, dating back to 1751. During that year, a room designated for storing correspondence generated by the City Administration was part of the first City Hall, which consisted of just four rooms, one of which were the archives. This provided the conditions necessary for preserving documents produced by the City Administration of Subotica, starting from 1743, when the city gained municipal autonomy and established civilian self-governance.

After the end of the World War II in Yugoslavia, the Department of Education of the executive committee of the Vojvodina People's Assembly established the local public archival region in 1946. In early 1949, the archival region evolved into an Archival Center and in 1952 the City State Archives in Subotica was established as an independent institution. In 1964, the institution was renamed the Historical Archives of Subotica.

== See also ==
- List of archives in Serbia
- State Archives of Serbia
- Archives of Vojvodina
