= National Museum of Zrenjanin =

- Народни музеј Зрењанин; Narodni muzej Zrenjanin; Nagybecskereki Népmúzeum; Muzeul Național din Zrenjanin

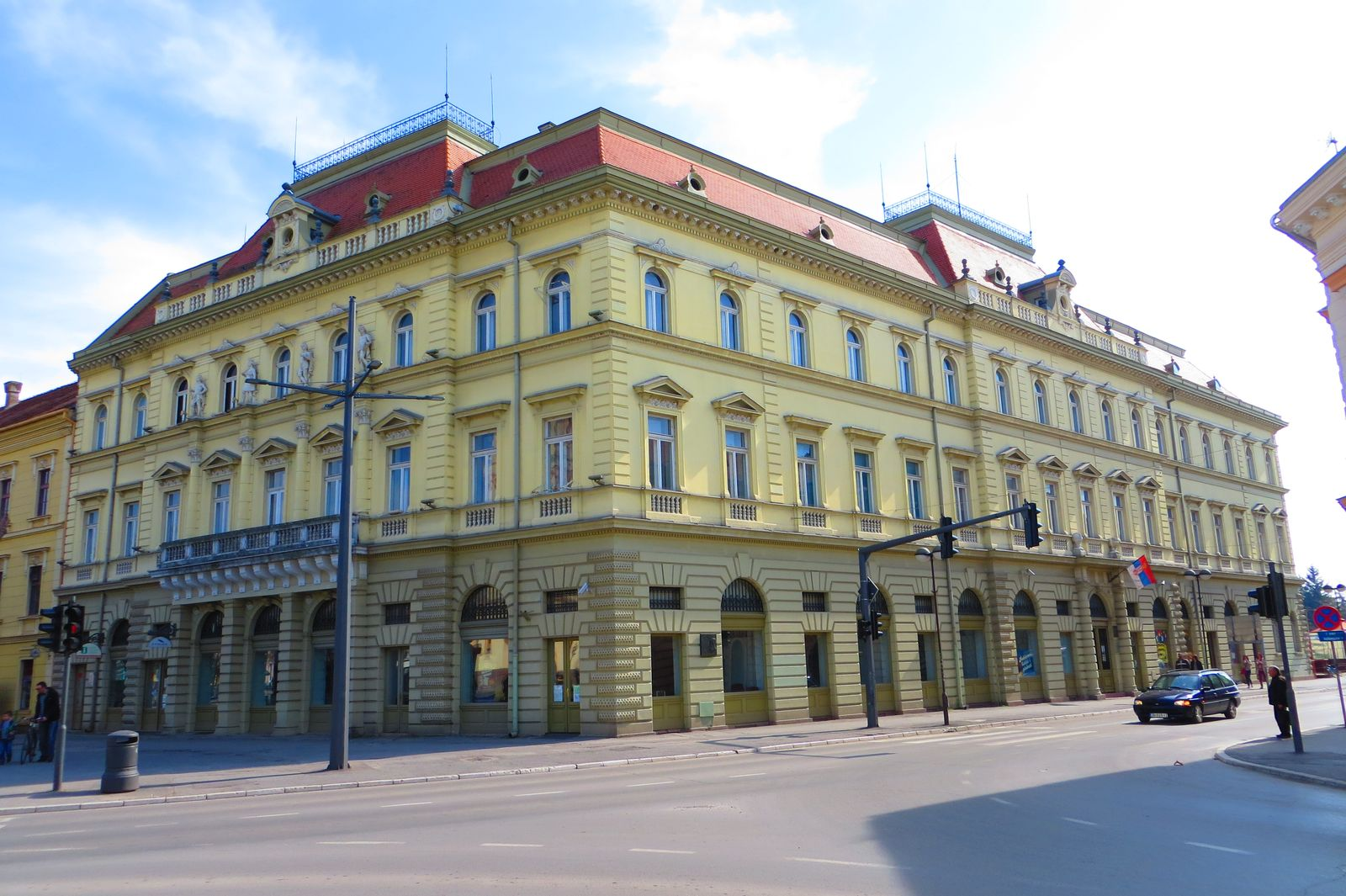
- The main building of the museum
- Established: 1911; 115 years ago
- Location: Zrenjanin, Vojvodina, Serbia
- Coordinates: 45.3797°N 20.3899°E
- Type: History museum Art museum
- Website: gms.rs

The National Museum of Zrenjanin (Serbian: Народни музеј Зрењанин, Narodni muzej Zrenjanin, Hungarian: Nagybecskereki Népmúzeum, Romanian: Muzeul Național din Zrenjanin) in Zrenjanin, Vojvodina, Serbia, is the city institution focused on the research, preservation and presentation of historical objects and artifacts related to Banat region. The museum, founded in 1911, has a permanent exhibition space of 1,200 m^{2}, showcasing applied arts, recent history, and ethnology. It also features a pedagogical service, restoration workshop, and a specialized library with over 5,000 titles. The building of Finance Palace, constructed in 1893, is a protected cultural monument in the neo-Renaissance style. The museum has been housed in the building since 1966. The Zrenjanin National Museum was named the best museum in Serbia in 2006.

== Gallery ==
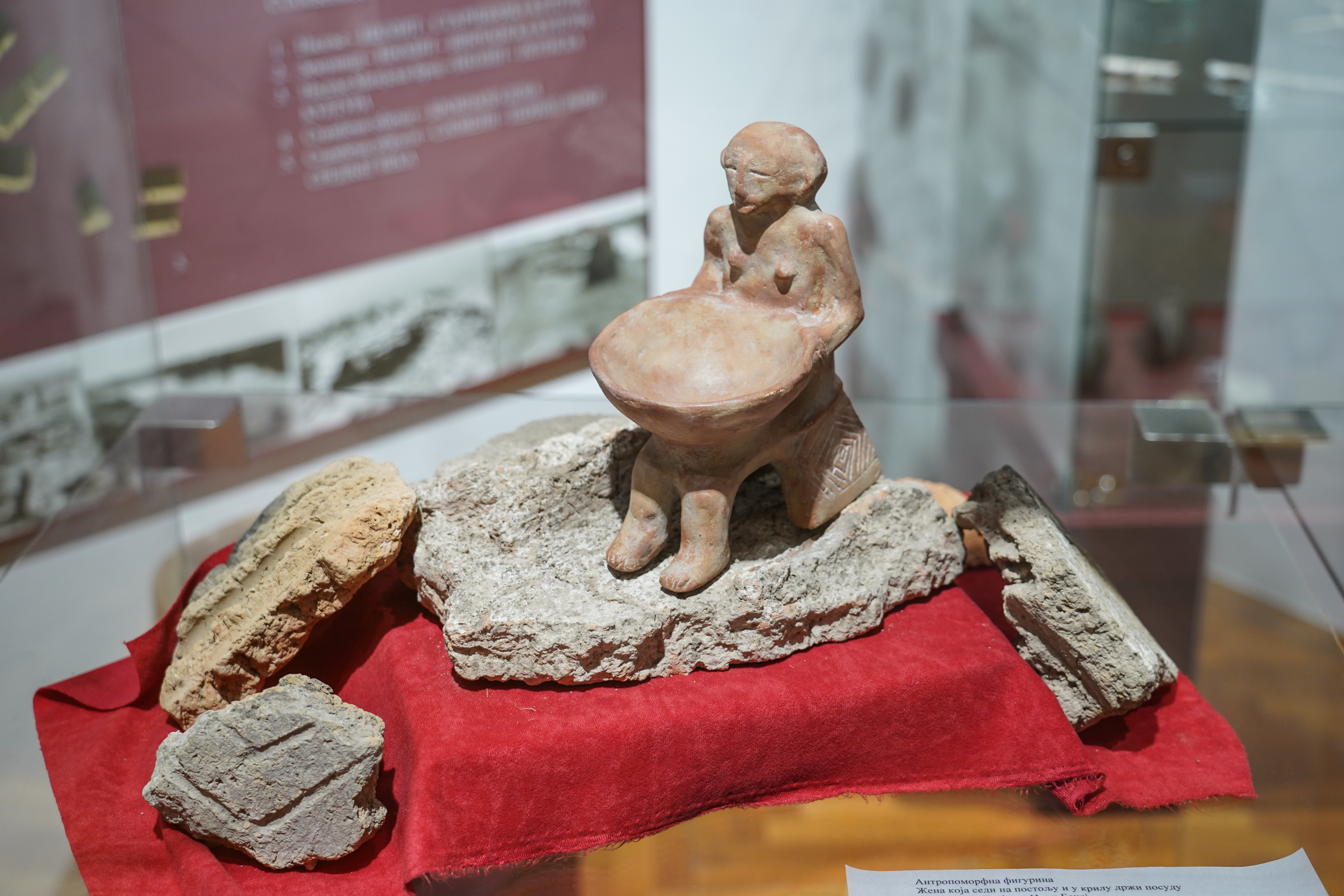
Anthropomorphic figurine from the Vinča culture

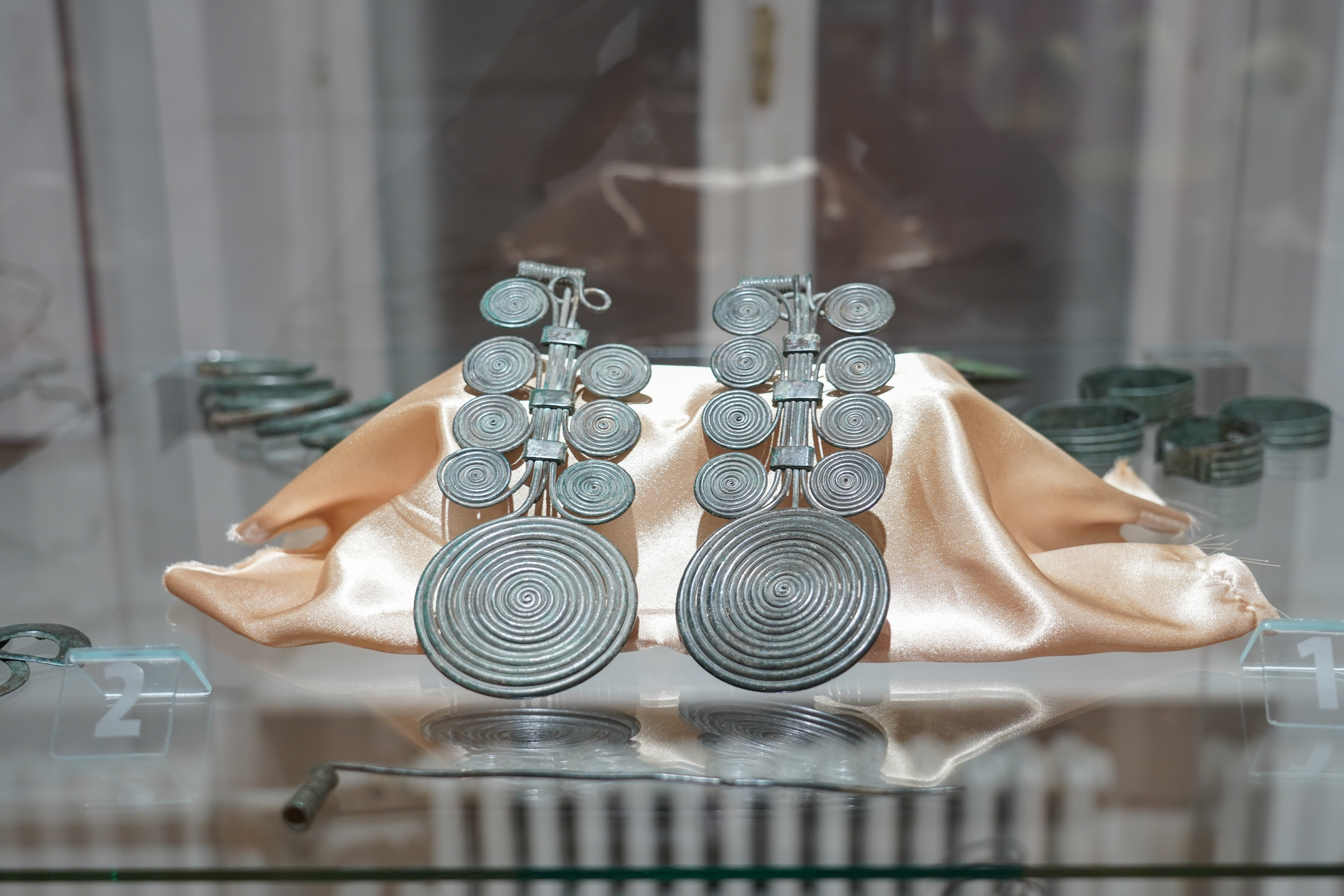
Decorative items from the Hallstatt culture

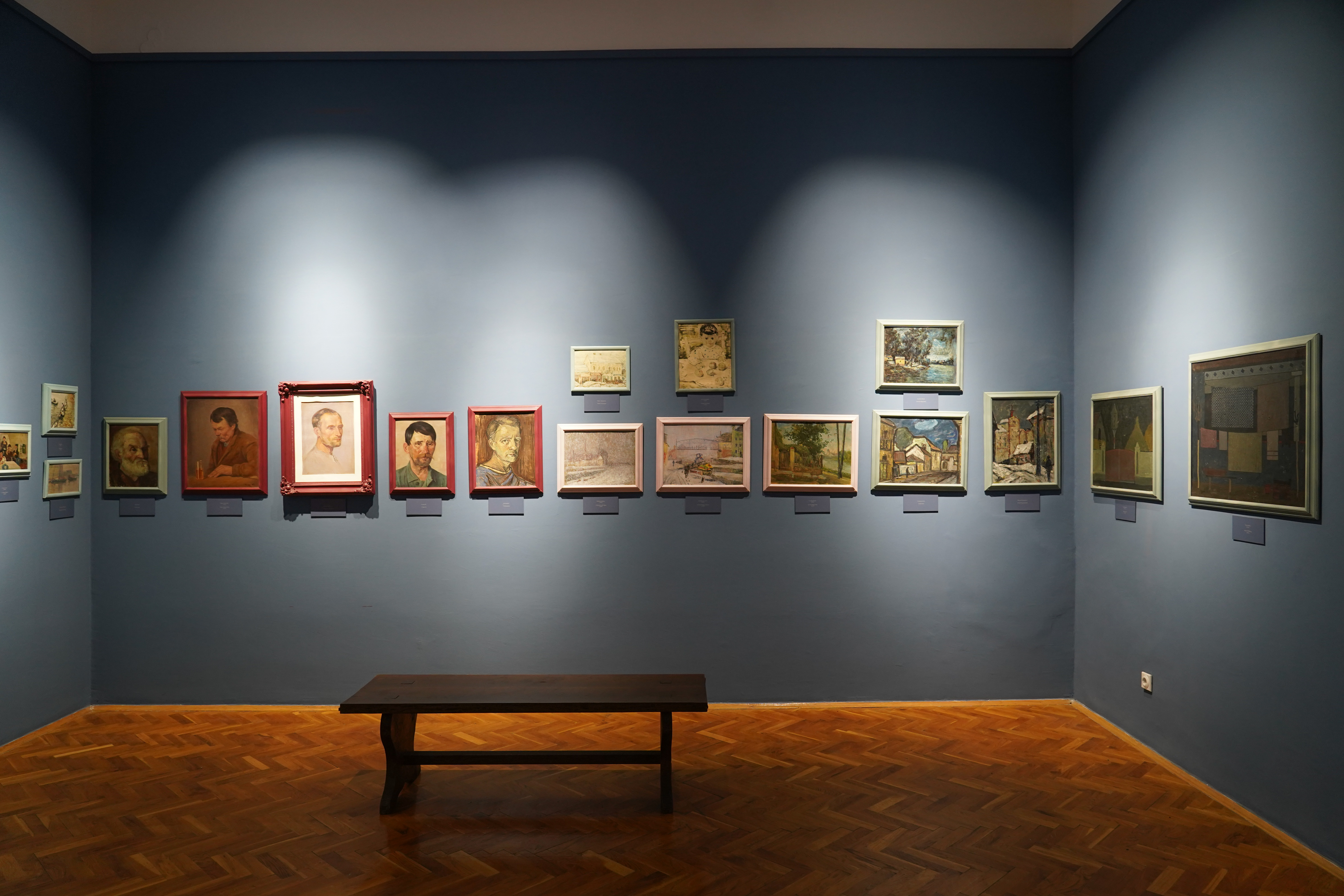
Paintings in the museum's permanent collection

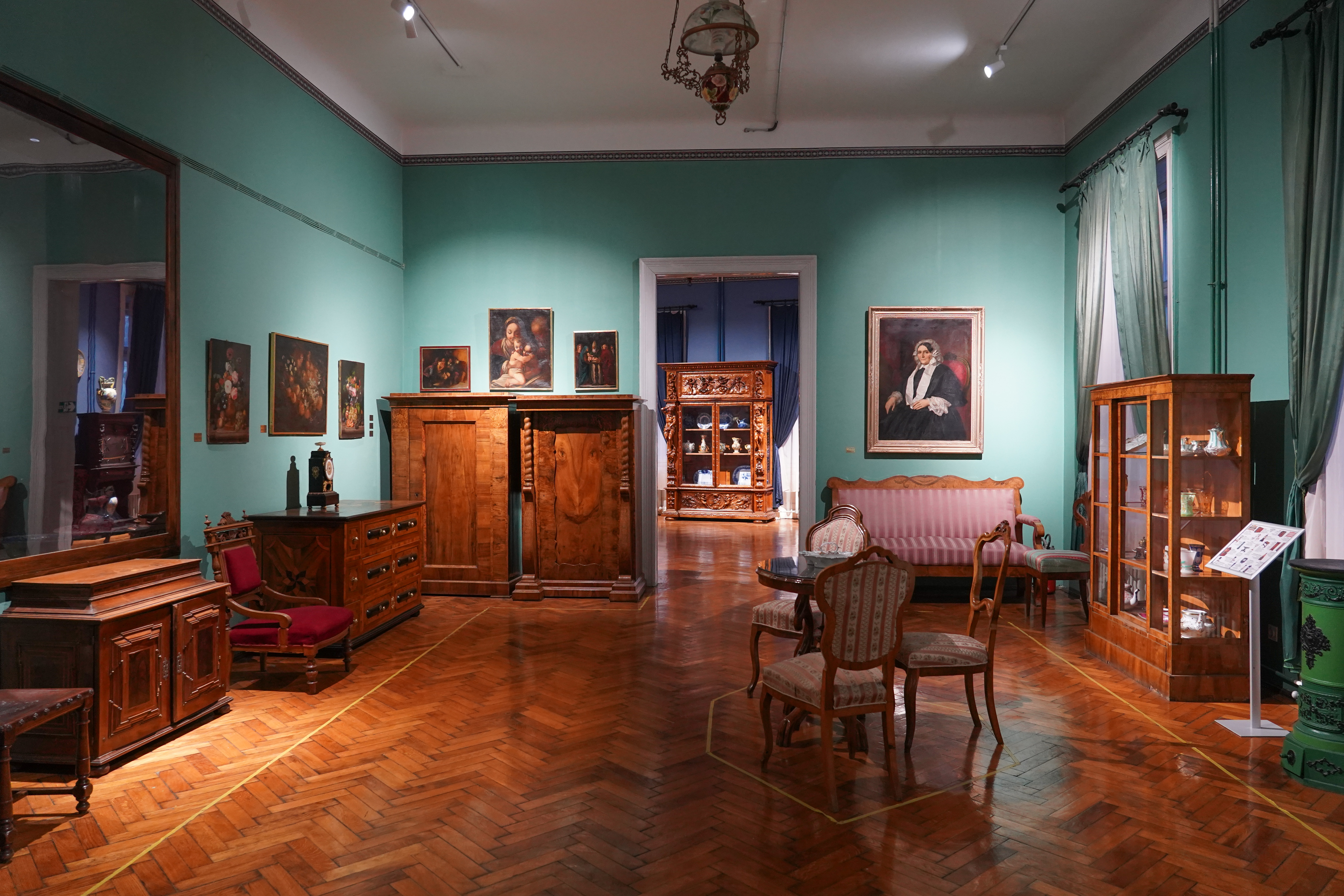
19th century furnishings

== See also ==
- List of museums in Serbia
- Historical Archive of Zrenjanin
