= Historical Archives of Novi Sad =

- Историјски архив Новог Сада (Serbian); Újvidéki Történeti Levéltár (Hungarian); Historický archív Nový Sad (Slovak); Исторички архив Нови Сад (Pannonian Rusyn)

Agency overview
- Formed: 1954; 72 years ago
- Jurisdiction: City Assembly of Novi Sad
- Headquarters: Filipa Višnjića 2a, Novi Sad, Vojvodina, Serbia; 45°15′49″N 19°51′08″E
- Parent agency: Archives of Vojvodina
- Website: Official website

Map
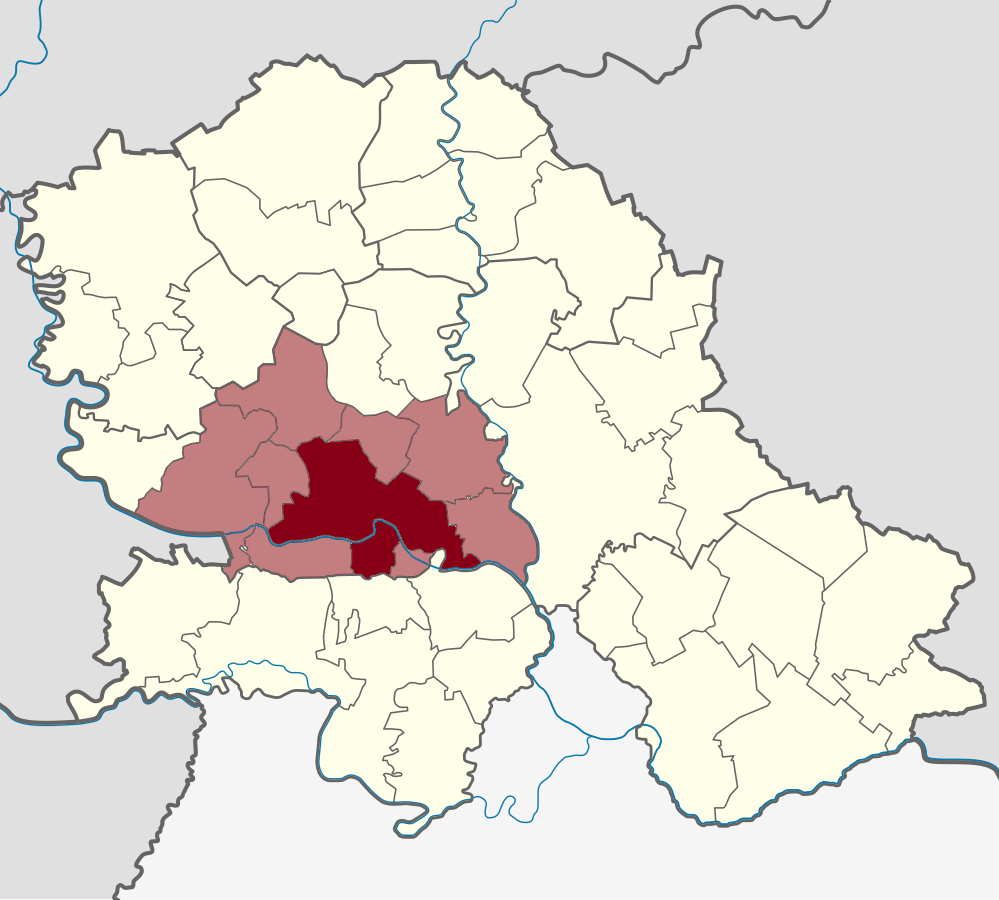
- Area served by the archives shown on the map of Vojvodina, Serbia

Historical Archives of Novi Sad (Serbian: Историјски архив Новог Сада, romanized: Istorijski arhiv Novog Sada, Hungarian: Újvidéki Történeti Levéltár, Slovak: Historický archív Nový Sad, Pannonian Rusyn: Исторички архив Нови Сад) are the primary institution responsible for preservation of archival materials in the western and central parts of the South Bačka District located in Novi Sad, Vojvodina, Serbia. They are the primary archival institution for the municipalities of Novi Sad, Titel, Žabalj, Temerin, Vrbas, Bačka Palanka, Bački Petrovac, Beočin, and Sremski Karlovci. The archives hold over 7,000 linear meters of archival material, organized into 914 fonds and collections with documents spaning from the mid-18th century to the present day.

== See also ==
- List of archives in Serbia
- State Archives of Serbia
- Archives of Vojvodina
