= Historical Archives of Senta =

- Историјски архив Сента (Serbian); Zenta Történeti Levéltára (Hungarian)
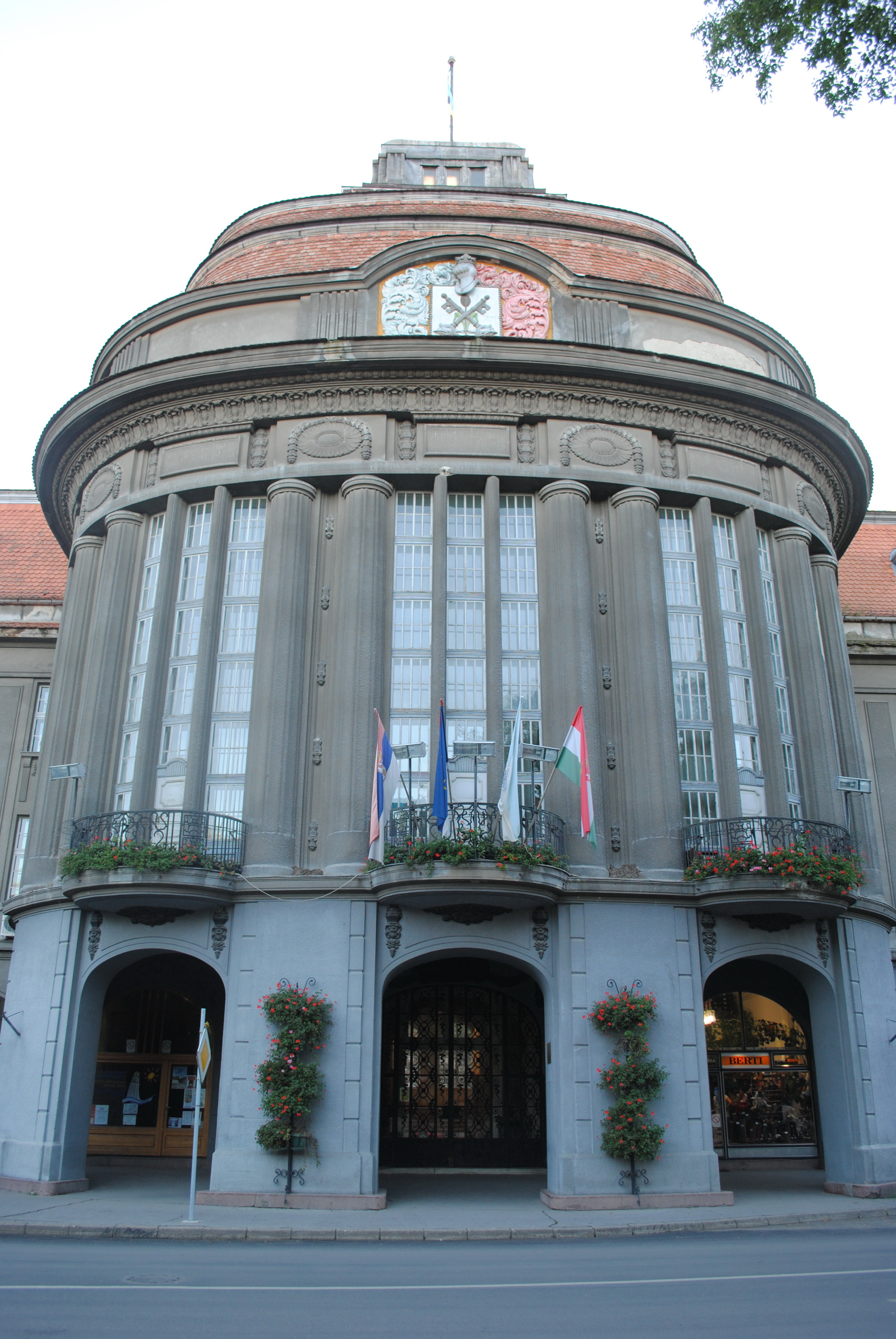
- Town Hall building housing the archives and other local institutions

Agency overview
- Formed: 1952; 74 years ago
- Jurisdiction: Government of Serbia
- Headquarters: Glavni trg 1/II, Senta, Vojvodina, Serbia; 45.9311°N 20.0887°E
- Agency executives: Director; István Fodor
- Parent agency: Archives of Vojvodina
- Website: Official website

Map
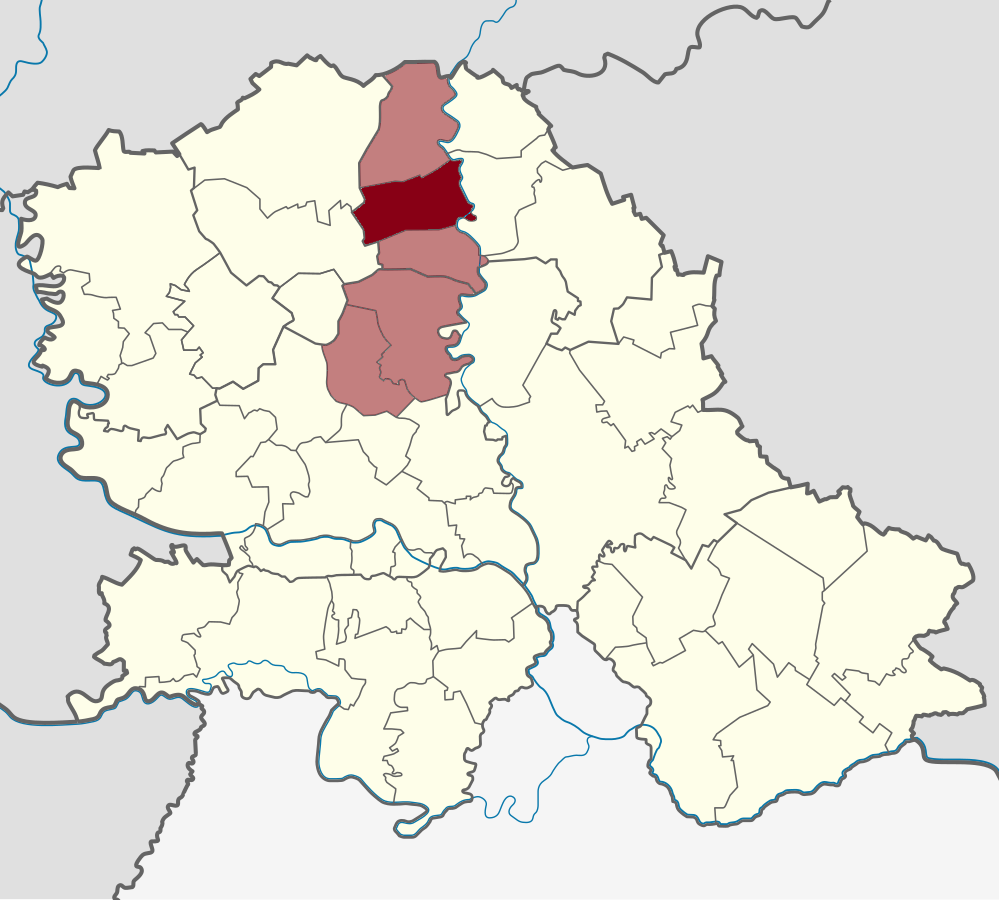
- Area served by the archives shown on the map of Vojvodina, Serbia

The Historical Archives of Senta (Serbian: Историјски архив Сента, Hungarian: Zenta Történeti Levéltára) are the primary institution responsible for preservation of archival materials in western Bačka parts of the North Banat District and northernmost parts of the South Bačka District located in Senta, Vojvodina, Serbia. They are the primary archival institution for the municipalities of Senta, Bečej, Srbobran, Ada, Kanjiža, while the remained of the North Banat District district is covered by the Historical Archives of Kikinda.

== See also ==
- List of archives in Serbia
- State Archives of Serbia
- Archives of Vojvodina
