= Zrenjanin City Hall =

City Hall in Zrenjanin, Serbia

Coordinates: 45.3807°N 20.3872°E

Zrenjanin City Hall at the beginning of the 20th century

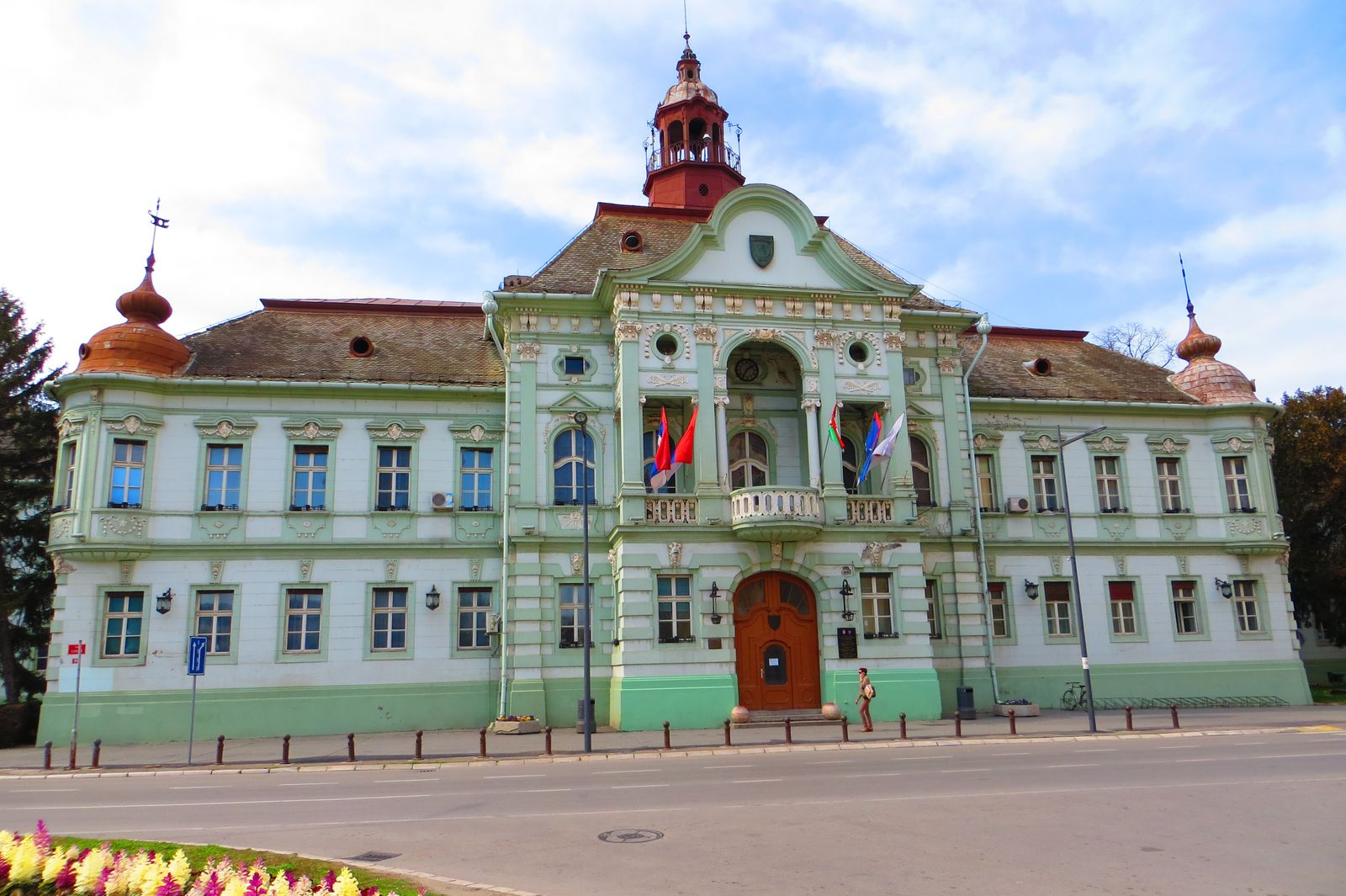
Zrenjanin City Hall building today

Zrenjanin City Hall (Serbian: Градска кућа / Gradska kuća, Hungarian: Városháza) is located at the Trg Slobode (Liberty Square) in Zrenjanin, Serbia. It is a seat of the Zrenjanin municipality.

== History ==
Present-day Zrenjanin (formerly known as Veliki Bečkerek / Nagybecskerek / Großbetschkerek / Becicherecul Mare) was a seat of Torontaliensis county from 1779. A great fire in 1807 destroyed almost every building in the city, including old county building. Construction works for a new building started in 1816 and were finished in 1820 under project of architect Joseph Fischer. From 1885 to 1887, county building was re-constructed under projects of two renowned architects from Budapest, Gyula Pártos and Ödön Lechner.

The county building was added by right and left wings, modernised facade in Neobaroque, new balcony, Zsolnay roof tile patterns and several other things like electrical lightning and telephone line. At that time, it was the most modern building in southern part of the Kingdom of Hungary.

Main stairs are decorated by three stained glasses, depicting personifications of "Justice", "Wisdom" and "Power". They were damaged during storm in the summer 2003, and repaired aftermath.

== Today ==
Zrenjanin City Hall is today a seat of Zrenjanin municipality authorities and Central Banat District. It is one of the most recognisable symbols of Zrenjanin, depicted on many postcards for 100 years. Since 1952 the building houses the Historical Archive of Zrenjanin.

== City park ==
In the building's backyard there is a city park - created in 1887 after re-construction of the City Hall. It is decorated by fountain with a stork, many sculptures and mural depicting old Bečkerek fortress. It is opened for public during summer.

== Gallery ==
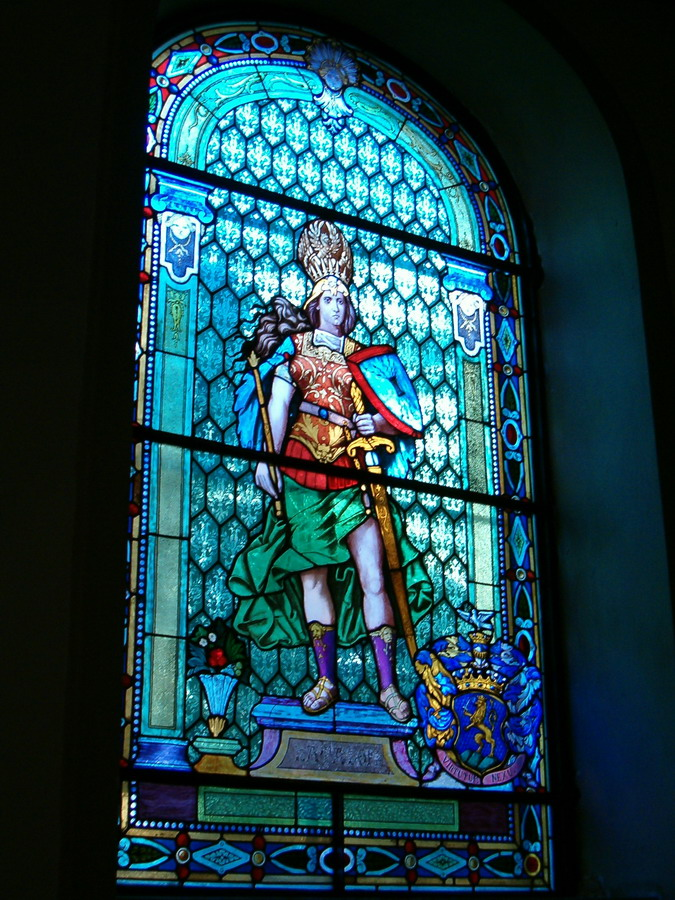
Stained glass "Force"

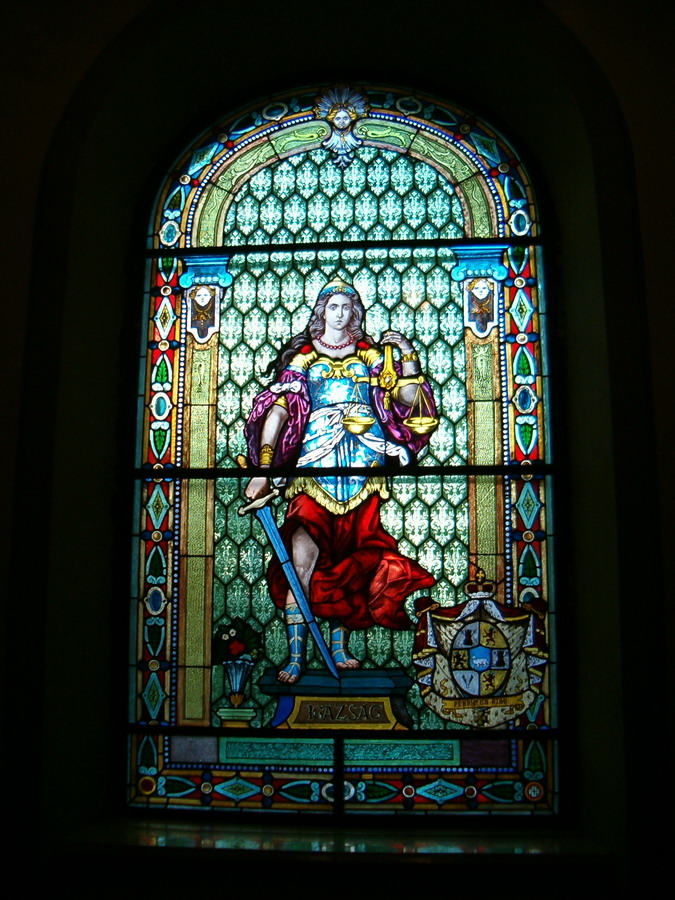
Stained glass "Justice"

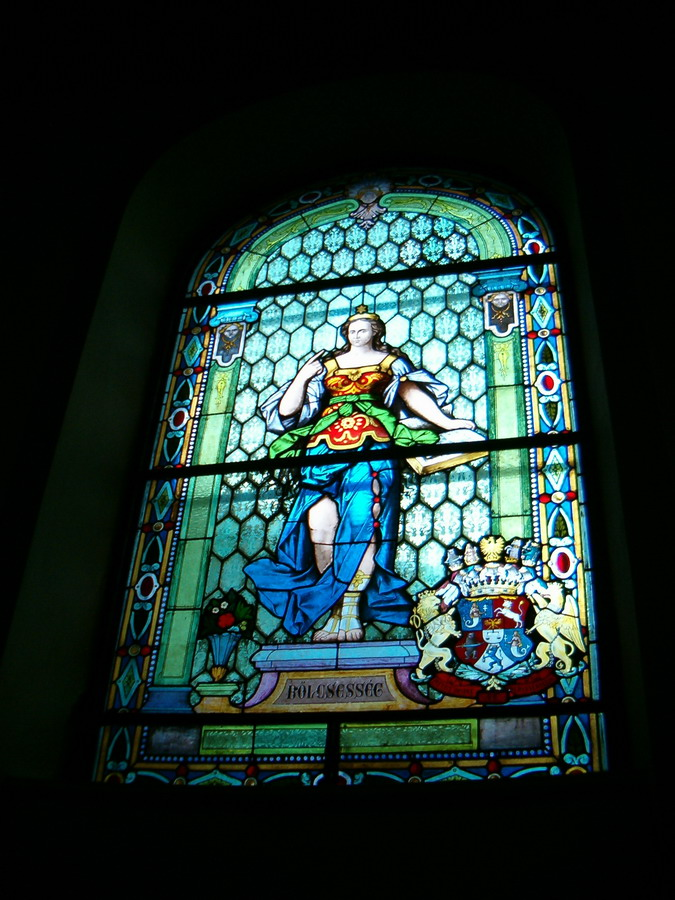
Stained glass "Wisdom"

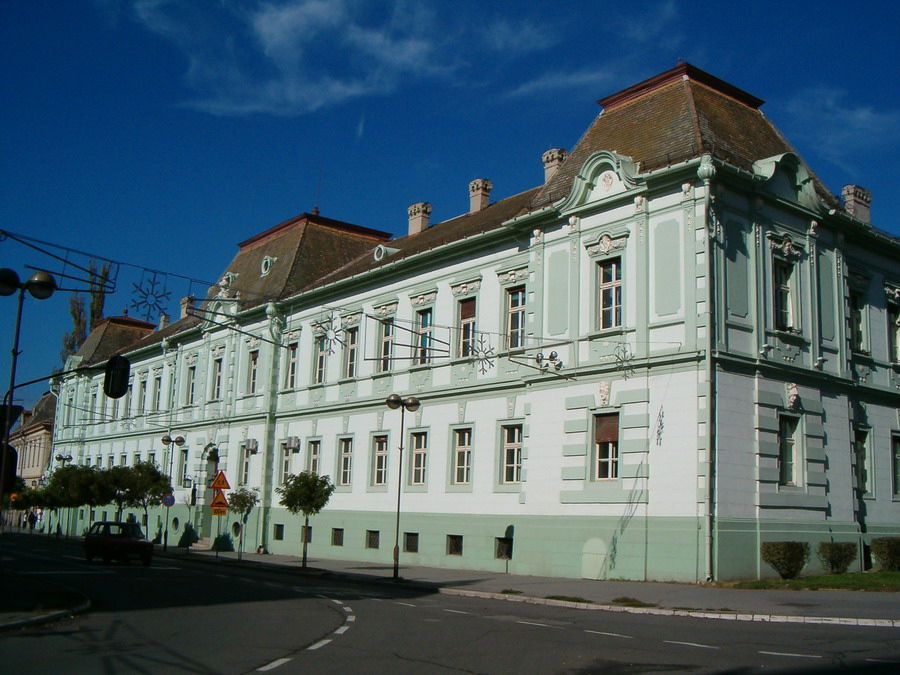
Right wing of the building

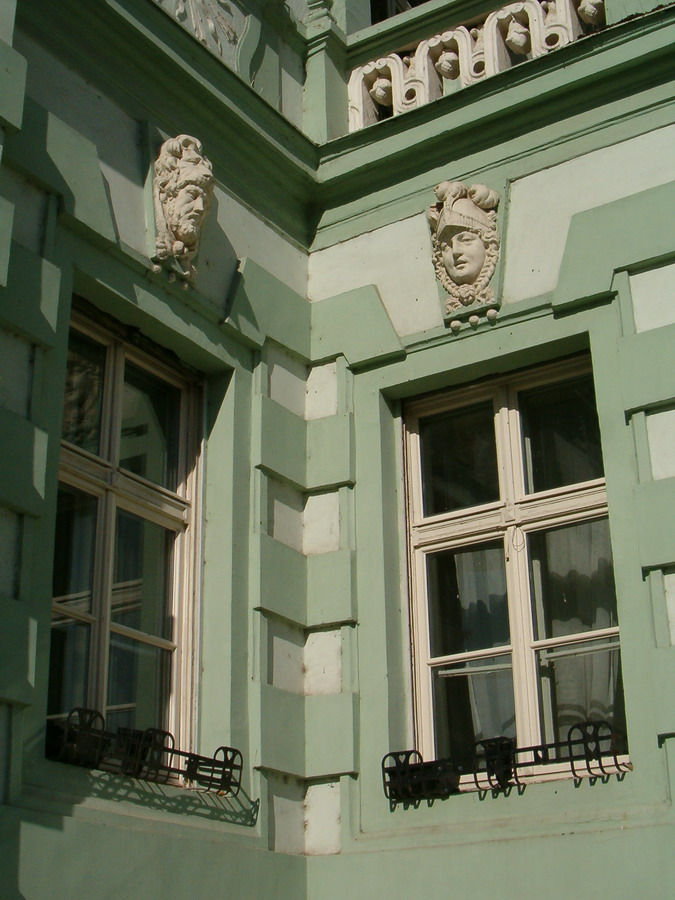
Facade detail

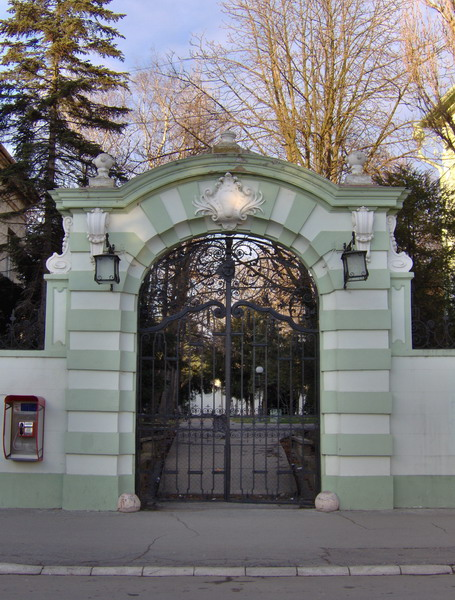
Entrance gate of the City park

== See also ==
- Zrenjanin
- Bács-Bodrog County Palace
