= Bács-Bodrog County Palace =

Coordinates: 45°46′11″N 19°07′05″E

- Палата Бачко-бодрошке жупаније у Сомбору; Palata Bačko-bodroške županije u Somboru
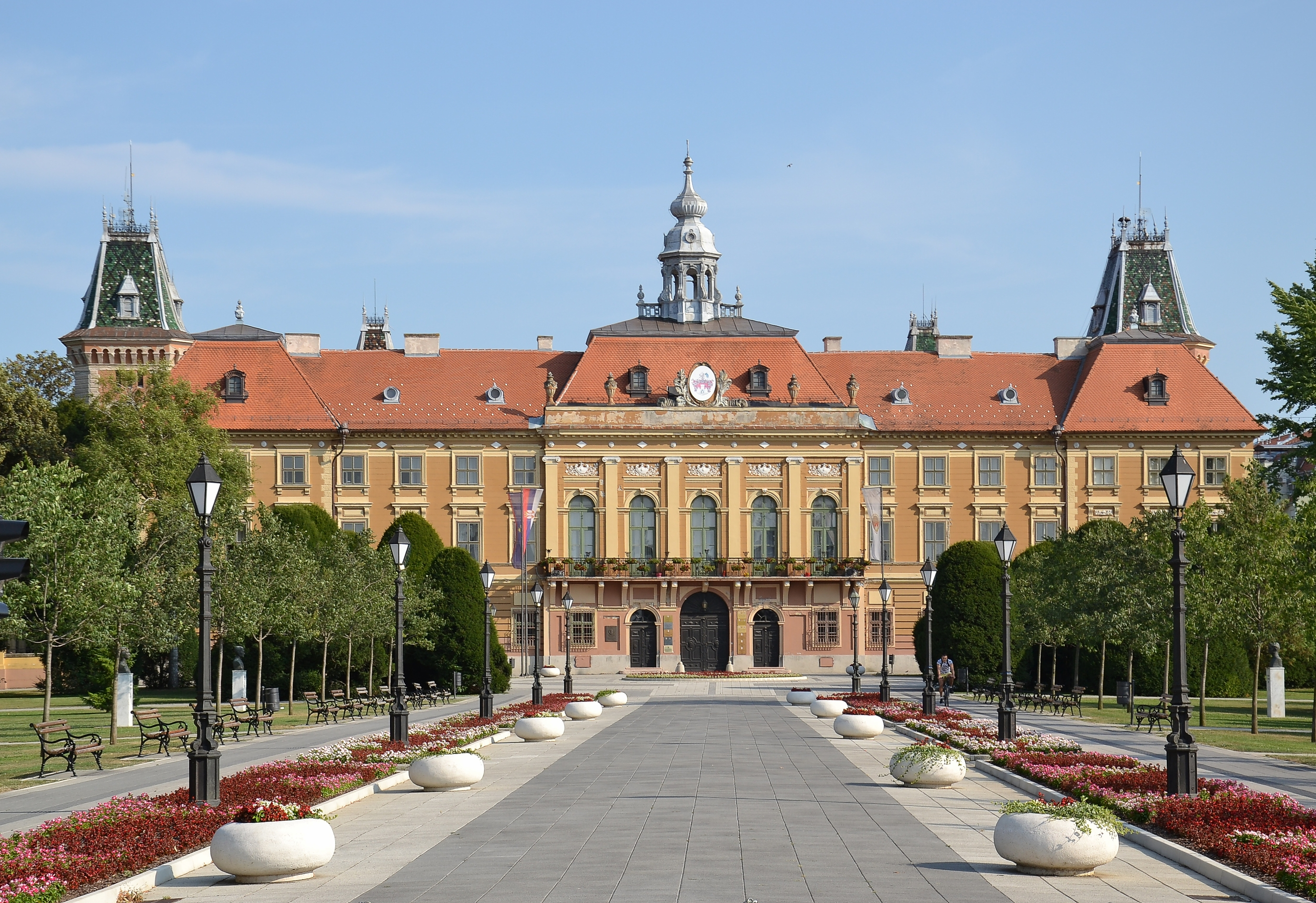
- Interactive map of the Bács-Bodrog County Palace area

General information
- Location: Sombor, Serbia
- Current tenants: City of Sombor

Cultural Heritage of Serbia
- Type: Protected Cultural Monument
- Designated: 11 November 1997
- Reference no.: SК 1172

The Bács-Bodrog County Palace (Serbian: Палата Бачко-бодрошке жупаније у Сомбору, Palata Bačko-bodroške županije u Somboru), known colloquially as Županija (lit. The County), is a representative building housing the municipal institutions of Sombor, city in the northwest of Vojvodina, Serbia. Historically it was built to house institutions of the Bács-Bodrog County. Due to its heritage value, it is listed as a protected cultural monument of the Republic of Serbia. Its eclectic façade dates back to 1882. The building features a ground floor, two upper floors, and a trapezoidal roof with dormer windows, adorned with four large vases with garlands and a central mandorla.

== History ==
After the retreat of the Ottomans in 1687, Sombor became part of Bačka County, which administratively absorbed the former Bodrog County in 1802. By the mid-18th century, Sombor hosted occasional county assemblies but did not yet house a permanent administrative centre. Despite initial resistance, including opposition to Sombor becoming a free royal city in 1749, Sombor emerged as the county seat when Joseph II, Holy Roman Emperor designated it as the permanent administrative centre of the county in 1786. Initially housed in a former Franciscan monastery, the growing administrative needs led to the construction of a dedicated county building. This new two-story structure, designed by county engineer Anton Bauer, was built between 1805 and 1809 on land provided by the city. It featured a rectangular layout with assembly halls and office spaces and was notable for its imposing presence, as described by contemporaries. By 1809, all county services relocated to this building. The building was originally protected by the provincial authorities of Vojvodina on 21 August 1948 and by nationwide decision in 1997.

== See also ==
- Novi Sad City Hall
- Zrenjanin City Hall
