= Historical Archives of Kikinda =

- Историјски архив Кикинда (Serbian); Nagykikinda Történeti Levéltára (Hungarian)

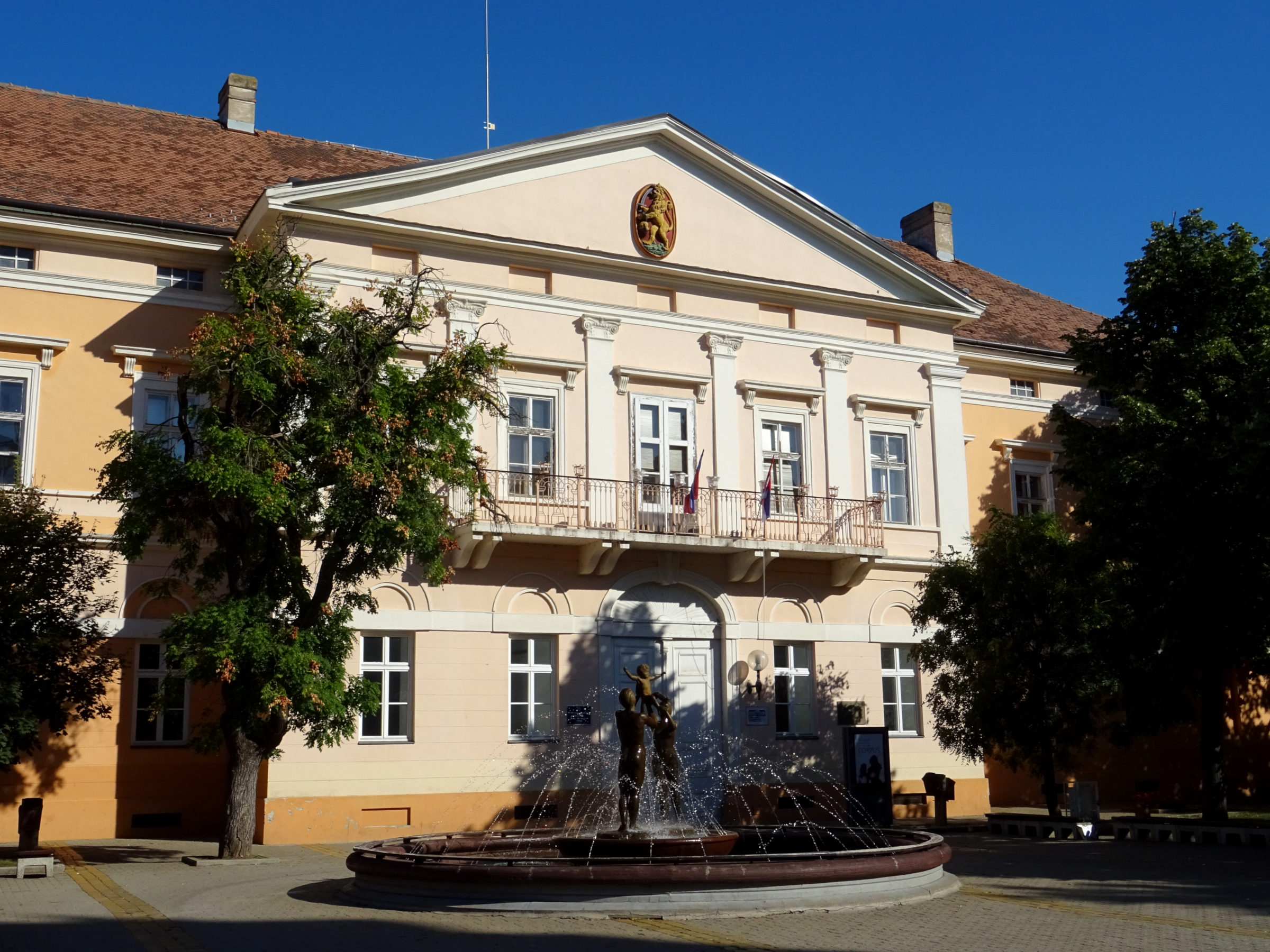
- Building housing the archives

Agency overview
- Formed: 1946; 80 years ago
- Jurisdiction: Government of Serbia
- Headquarters: Trg srpskih dobrovoljaca 21, 23 300 Kikinda, Vojvodina, Serbia; 45.8304°N 20.4650°E
- Parent agency: Archives of Vojvodina
- Website: Official website

Map
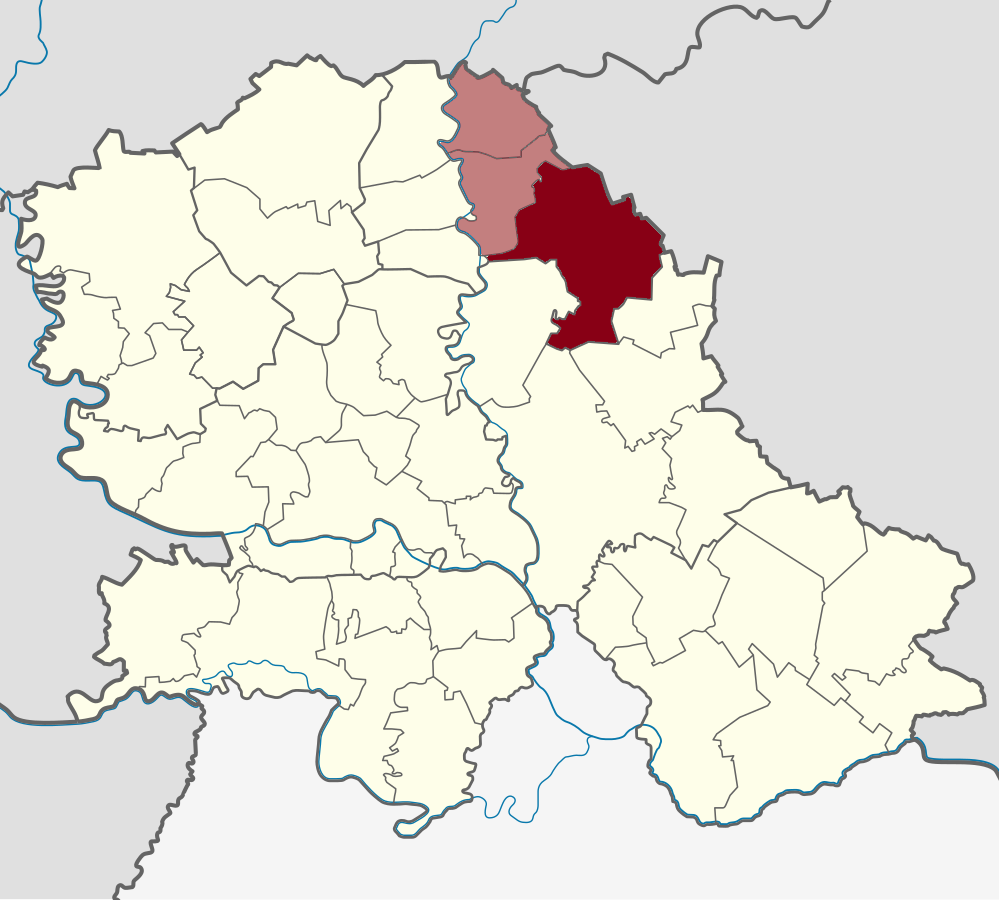
- Area served by the archives shown on the map of Vojvodina, Serbia

The Historical Archives of Kikinda (Serbian: Историјски архив Кикинда, Hungarian: Nagykikinda Történeti Levéltára) are the primary institution responsible for preservation of archival materials in central and eastern parts of the North Banat District located in Kikinda, Vojvodina, Serbia. They are the primary archival institution for the municipalities of Kikinda, Čoka, and Novi Kneževac, while the western Bačka parts of the district are covered by the Historical Archives of Senta. The Historical Archives of Kikinda are housed in the palace of the District of Velika Kikinda which is today housing both the archives and the city museum.

== See also ==
- List of archives in Serbia
- State Archives of Serbia
- Archives of Vojvodina
