= Archives of Vojvodina =

Archives in Serbia

- Архив Војводине (Serbian) Vajdasági levéltár (Hungarian); Archív Vojvodiny (Slovak); Arhivele Voivodinei (Romanian); Arhiv Vojvodine (Croatian) Архив Войводини (Pannonian Rusyn)

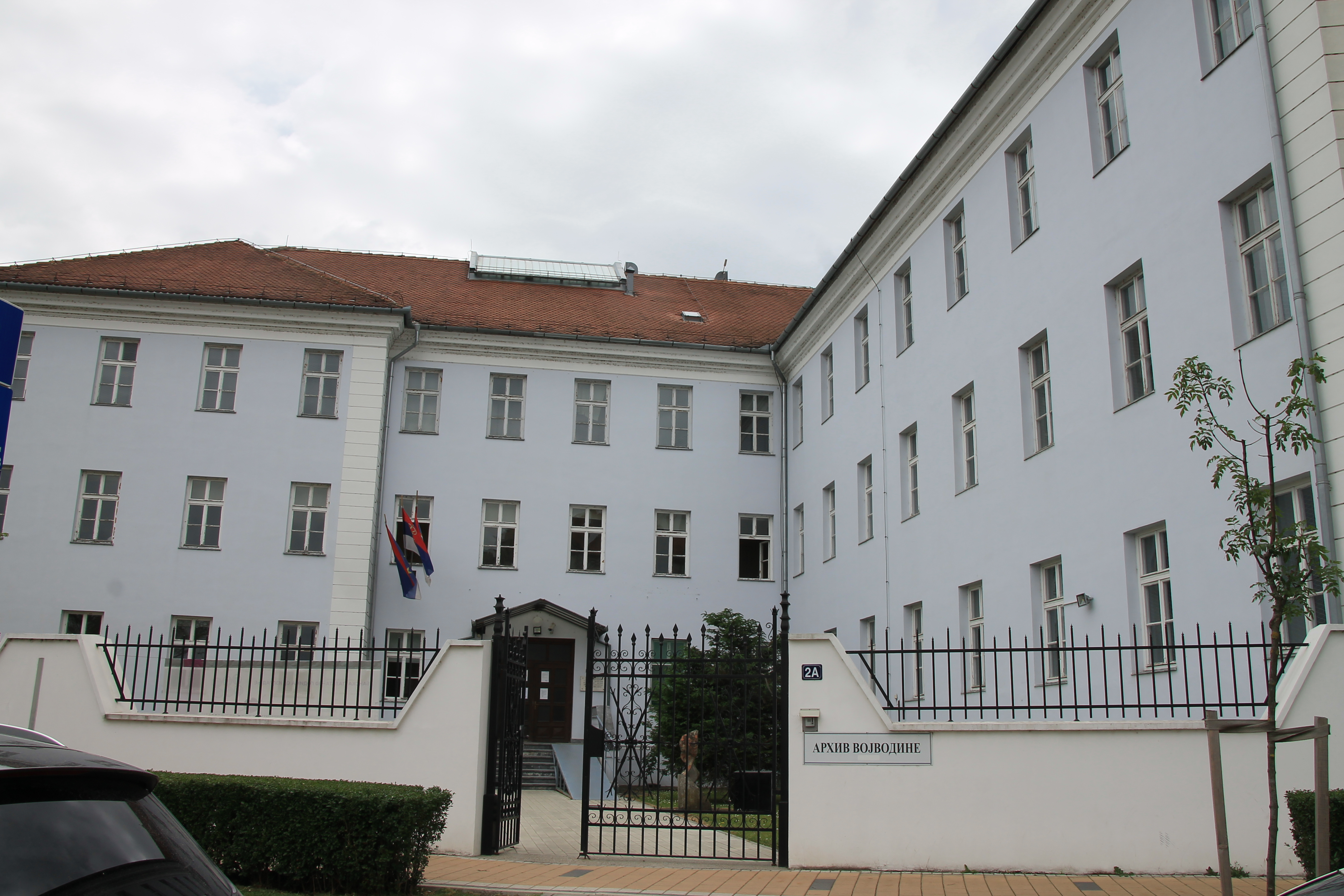

Agency overview
- Formed: 1926
- Jurisdiction: Government of Vojvodina
- Headquarters: Novi Sad, Vojvodina, Serbia; 45.2569°N 19.8520°E
- Parent agency: State Archives of Serbia
- Child agency: Historical Archives of Bela Crkva Historical Archives of Kikinda Historical Archives of Novi Sad Historical Archives of Pančevo Historical Archives of Senta Historical Archives of Sombor Historical Archives "Syrmia" of Sremska Mitrovica Historical Archives of Subotica Historical Archives of Zrenjanin
- Website: Official website

Map
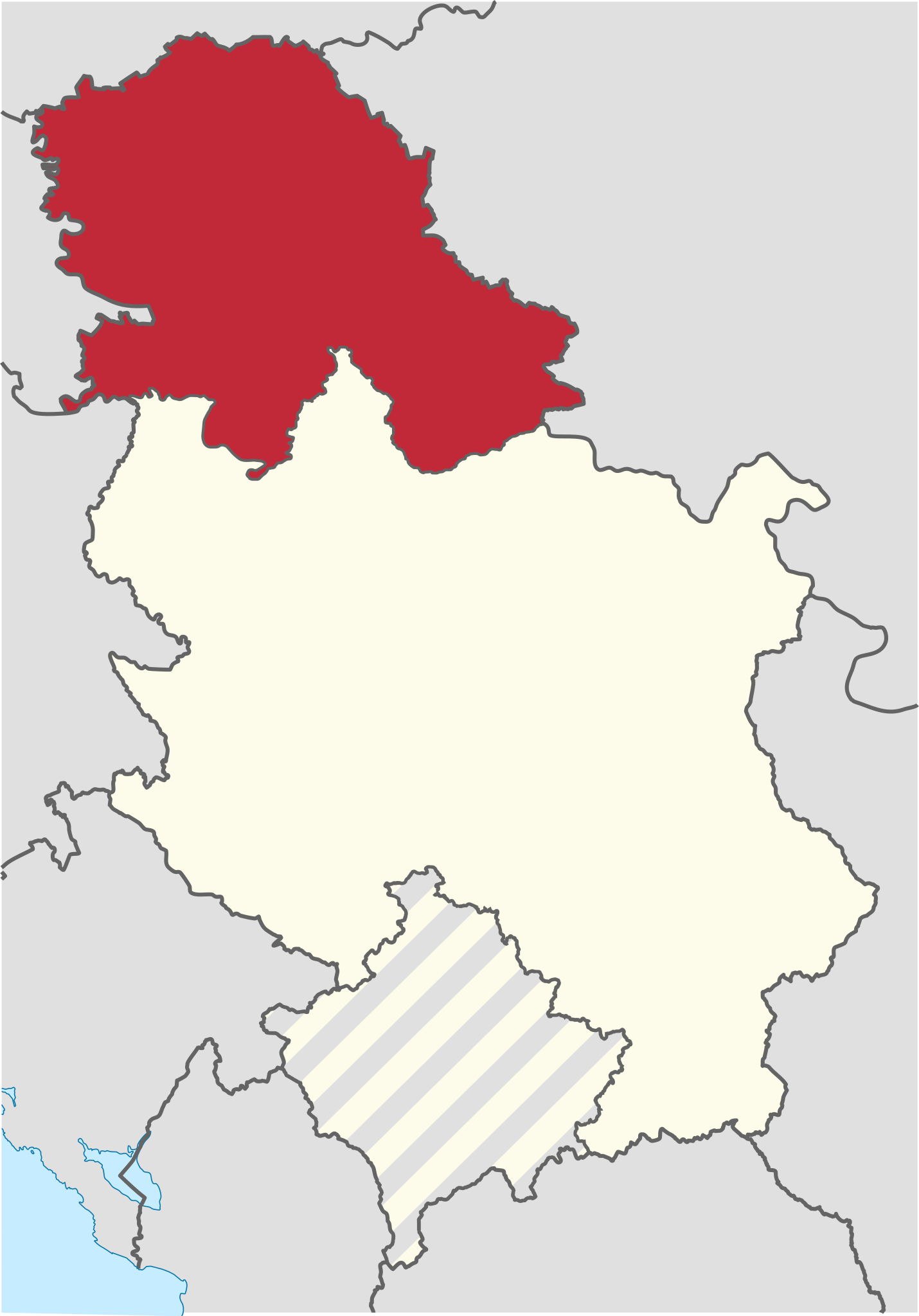
- Area of Vojvodina served by the Archives of Vojvodina shown on the map of Serbia

The Archives of Vojvodina (Serbian: Архив Војводине, Hungarian: Vajdasági levéltár, Slovak: Archív Vojvodiny, Romanian: Arhivele Voivodinei, Croatian: Arhiv Vojvodine, Pannonian Rusyn: Архив Войводини) are the central archival institution responsible for collecting information about archival material in Vojvodina, an autonomous province in northern Serbia. Some 7,902 meters of archival documents spread across 520 funds and collections, spanning from the first half of the 18th century to the year 2000 are kept at the archive.

The legal status of the archives is defined on the provisions of the state level Law on the Protection of Cultural Goods from 1994, the Law on Culture from 2009, and the Law on Determination of the Competences of the Autonomous Province of Vojvodina from 2009. In addition to archival material related to Vojvodina, the archives preserve a significant material related to the history of Serbs in Croatia, particularly but not limited to the region of Baranya and the rest of eastern Croatia.

== Legal framework ==
According to the Law on the Archives and Archival Work, the Archives of Vojvodina are one of only three public archives (alongside Historical Archive of Belgrade and Historical Archive of Novi Sad) in which founding rights do not belong to the central government directly but to the provincial (Government of Vojvodina) or city authorities (of Belgrade and Novi Sad, respectively). In addition, together with the State Archives of Serbia, the Archives of Vojvodina are defined as one of two central archives in Serbia. In addition to standardized archival practices, central archives have specific additional responsibilities of maintaining records, examining, training and overseeing subordinate archives. In Vojvodina, these tasks are devolved to the Archives of Vojvodina as a delegated responsibilities but are conducted in accordance with the instructions and guidance of the central State Archives of Serbia. This ensures standardization and coordination across the national archival system while allowing the Archives of Vojvodina to effectively manage and support local archival operations.

== History ==
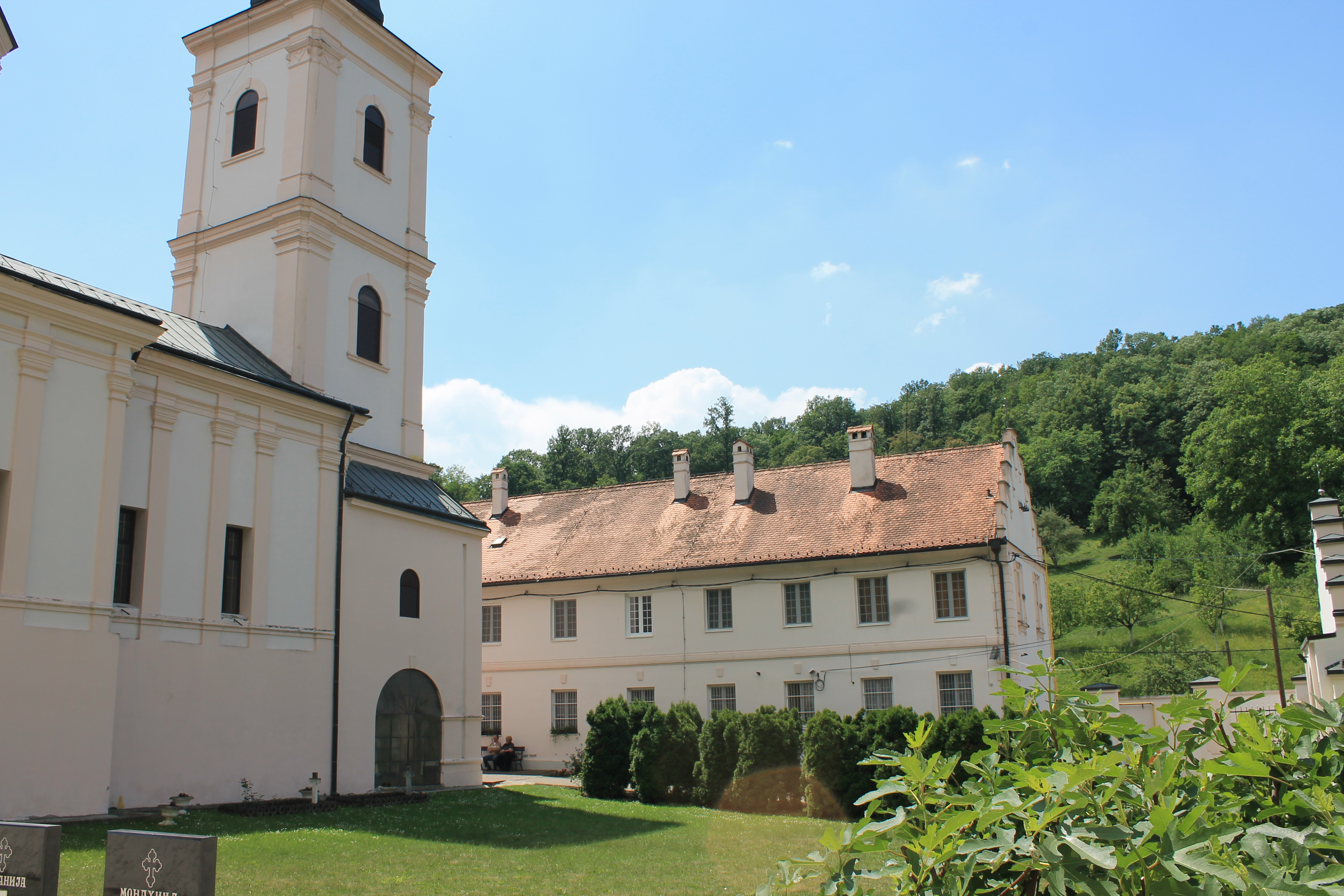
Beočin Monastery housed the archival materials from 1968 until late 1980s

The Archives of Vojvodina were established in 1926 as the State Archive in Novi Sad. By the decision of the Assistant Minister of Education of the Kingdom of Serbs, Croats, and Slovenes of August 5, 1926 the first archivist appointed was Dr. Dimitrije Kirilović. He invited the historian Aleksa Ivić, a professor at the Faculty of Law in Subotica, to compile a report on the state of archival material in Vojvodina. During World War II in Yugoslavia, parts of Novi Sad in Syrmia were within the borders of the Independent State of Croatia. At that time, the archive building was located in the Petrovaradin Magistrate building, where the archive had moved in 1934. A significant portion of the archival material was taken over by the Ustasha authorities, and some was transferred to Vienna and private collections in ossupied Czechoslovakia. A significant part of the archival material was lost in the basements of the Petrovaradin Fortress.

After the liberation in 1945, the Archives were housed in the basement premises of the Banovina Palace. From 1951, the Archives were named the State Archives of the Autonomous Province of Vojvodina, and from 1958, the Historical Archives of the Autonomous Province of Vojvodina. Their current name was adopted in 1970. The return of stolen items required more space, so the Serbian Orthodox Church provided the Patriarchate Court in Sremski Karlovci, and from 1968, the monastery lodgings in Beočin. The building of the District Prison was renovated during 1988 and 1989, and the Archives of Vojvodina ceremoniously moved into it on April 27, 1989.

In 1990, in the context breakup of Yugoslavia and the so-called anti-bureaucratic revolution, the Archives of Vojvodina lost its jurisdiction as the central archives in Vojvodina responsible for the supervision of regional intermunicipal public archives. However, in 2003, this authority was restored by the decision of the Assembly of Vojvodina. Starting in 2004, the Archives of Vojvodina resumed their role in overseeing and supervising archival work throughout the province.

== Awards ==
The Archives of Vojvodina has received several social awards for its professional, scientific, and cultural contributions, including: the Order of Merit for the People - Award of the Presidency of the SFRY in 1986; the Golden Archive - Award of the Archives of Serbia in 1999; the Spark of Culture - Award of the Institute for Culture of Vojvodina in 2006. The Archives of Vojvodina were also awarded the Order of the Karađorđe Star, second class, by the decree of the President of Serbia in 2016, for outstanding merits in preserving cultural and historical heritage, on the occasion of the 90th anniversary of its founding and successful work.

== See also ==
- List of archives in Serbia
- State Archives of Serbia
- Archives of Sremski Karlovci
- Archives of Republika Srpska
- Historical Archive of Srem
