= Sombor City Museum =

- Градски музеј Сомбор; Gradski muzej Sombor; Zombori Városi Múzeum

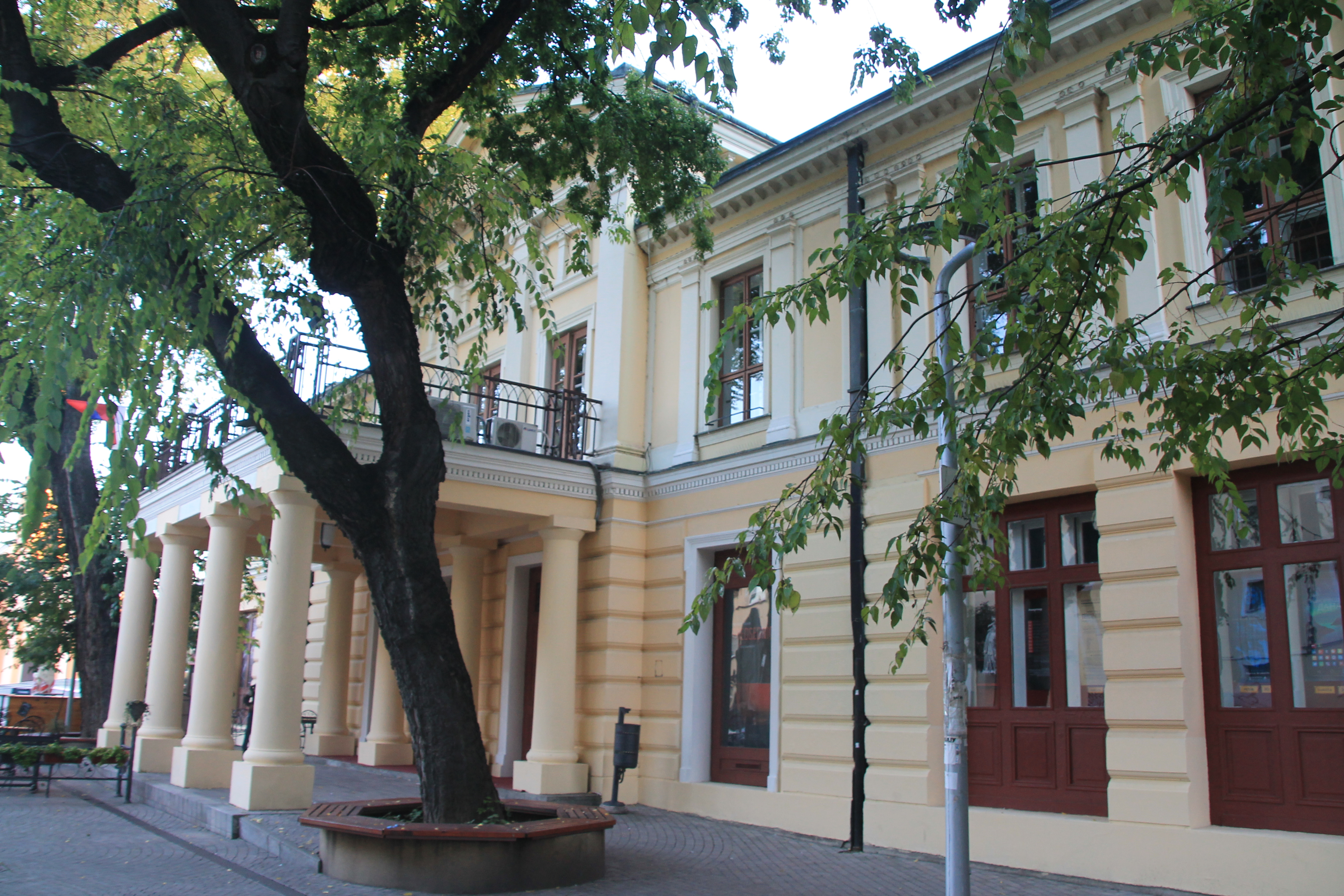
- The main building of the museum
- Established: 1887; 139 years ago
- Location: Sombor, Vojvodina, Serbia
- Coordinates: 45.7721°N 19.1116°E
- Type: History museum Art museum
- Website: gms.rs

The Sombor City Museum (Serbian: Градски музеј Сомбор, Gradski muzej Sombor, Hungarian: Zombori Városi Múzeum) in Sombor, Vojvodina, Serbia, is the city institution focused on the research, preservation and presentation of historical objects and artifacts related to the west Bačka region. The museum was founded in 1887 when the society received its first exhibition space and today it focuses on local history in the municipalities of Sombor, Apatin, Odžaci, Kula and Bač. It is a complex museum with around 40,000 exhibits divided into five categories: archaeological, numismatic, historical, ethnological, and art collections. The museum publishes the Annual Journal of the City Museum of Sombor.

== History ==
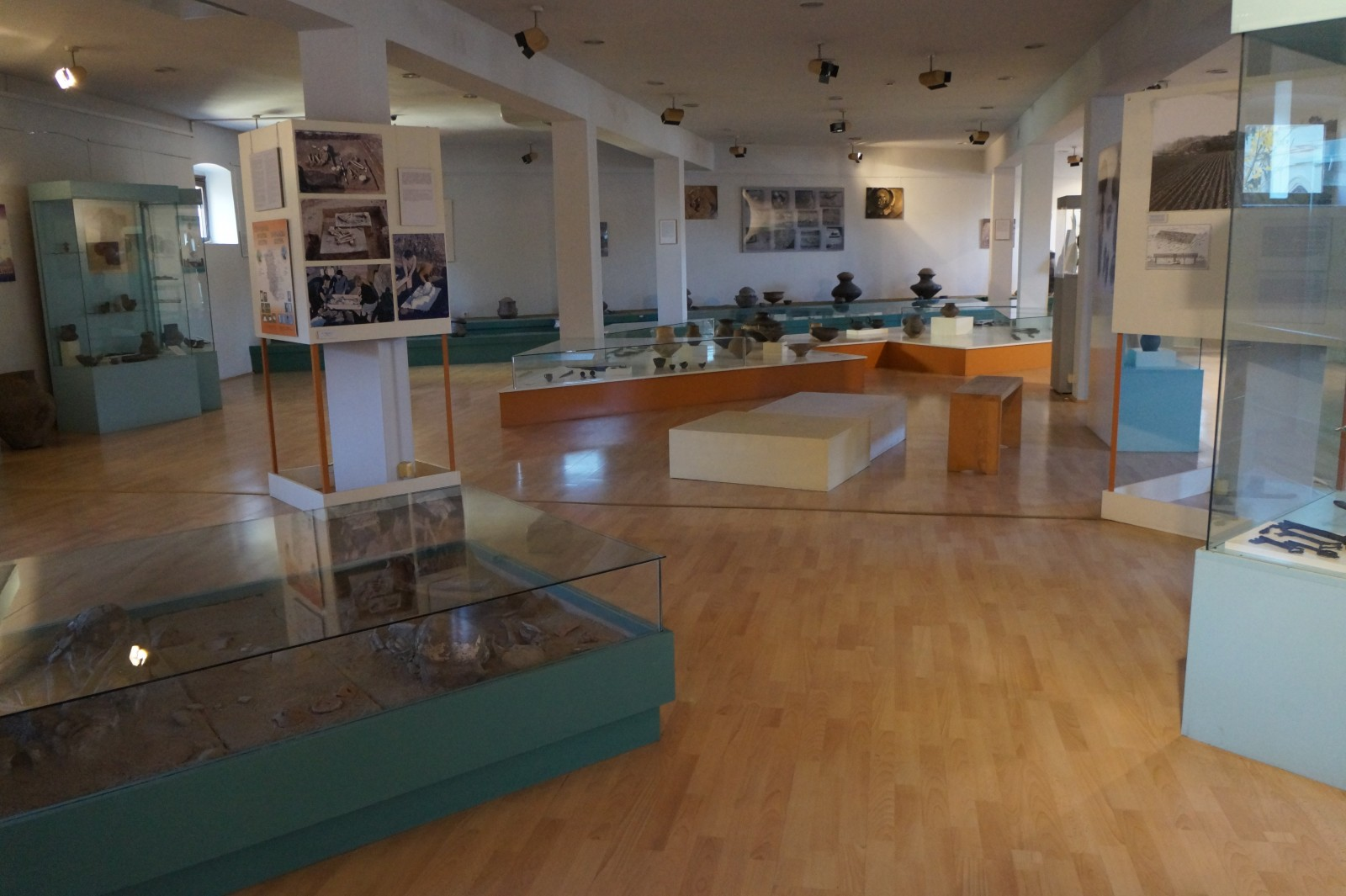
The Archeology Room

The museum's origin is tied to the initiative of István Iványi, who founded the Historical Society of Bács-Bodrog County in 1883. After World War I, Sombor lost its regional role, and the museum's assets were transferred to Novi Sad in 1930. The assets were returned in 1936 when the Historical Society of Sombor was re-established under Radivoje Simonović. The society aimed to collect and organize antiquities related to the county's history. In 1887, the society received a space in Sombor's County building for museum purposes. The society expanded its activities in 1906 to include the collection of ethnographic materials. The museum was reopened on March 14, 1945. The painter Milan Konjović was appointed its director. In 1952, the museum received the legacy of Imre Frej, enriching its numismatic and archaeological collections.

== Collection ==
The museum houses archaeological, ethnological, historical, and artistic treasures. Its archaeological collection features artifacts from the Neolithic Starčevo and Vinča culture, as well as items from the Metal, Bronze, Roman, and Celtic periods. The museum also houses a rich numismatic collection with coins from ancient to modern times, and its gallery of contemporary art showcases works from the 1960s to the 1990s. The ethnological section displays items illustrating daily life in the region, including traditional costumes, furniture, and unique artifacts like molds for gingerbread and Easter eggs.

== Gallery ==
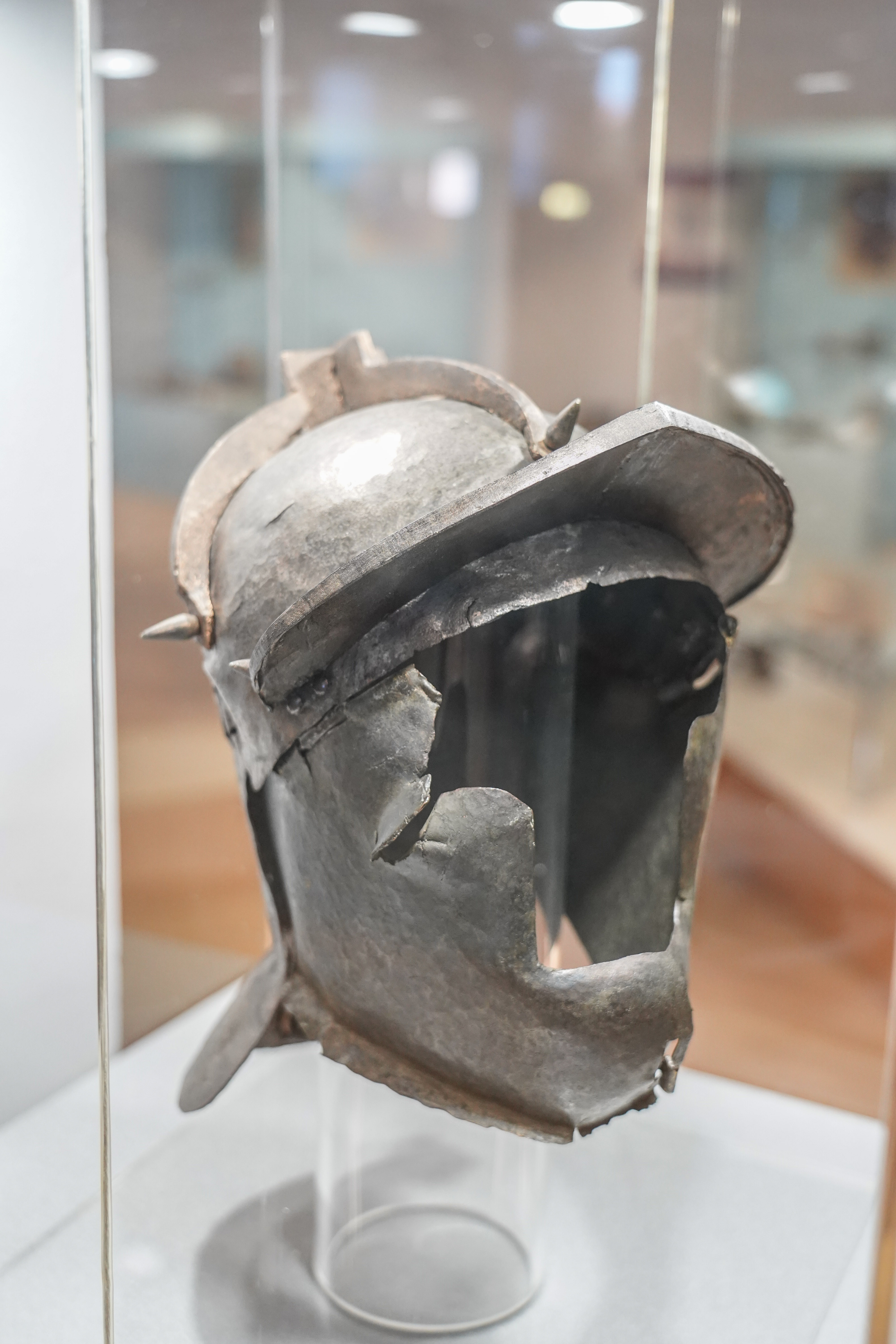
A 2nd century Roman helmet discovered in nearby Sivac

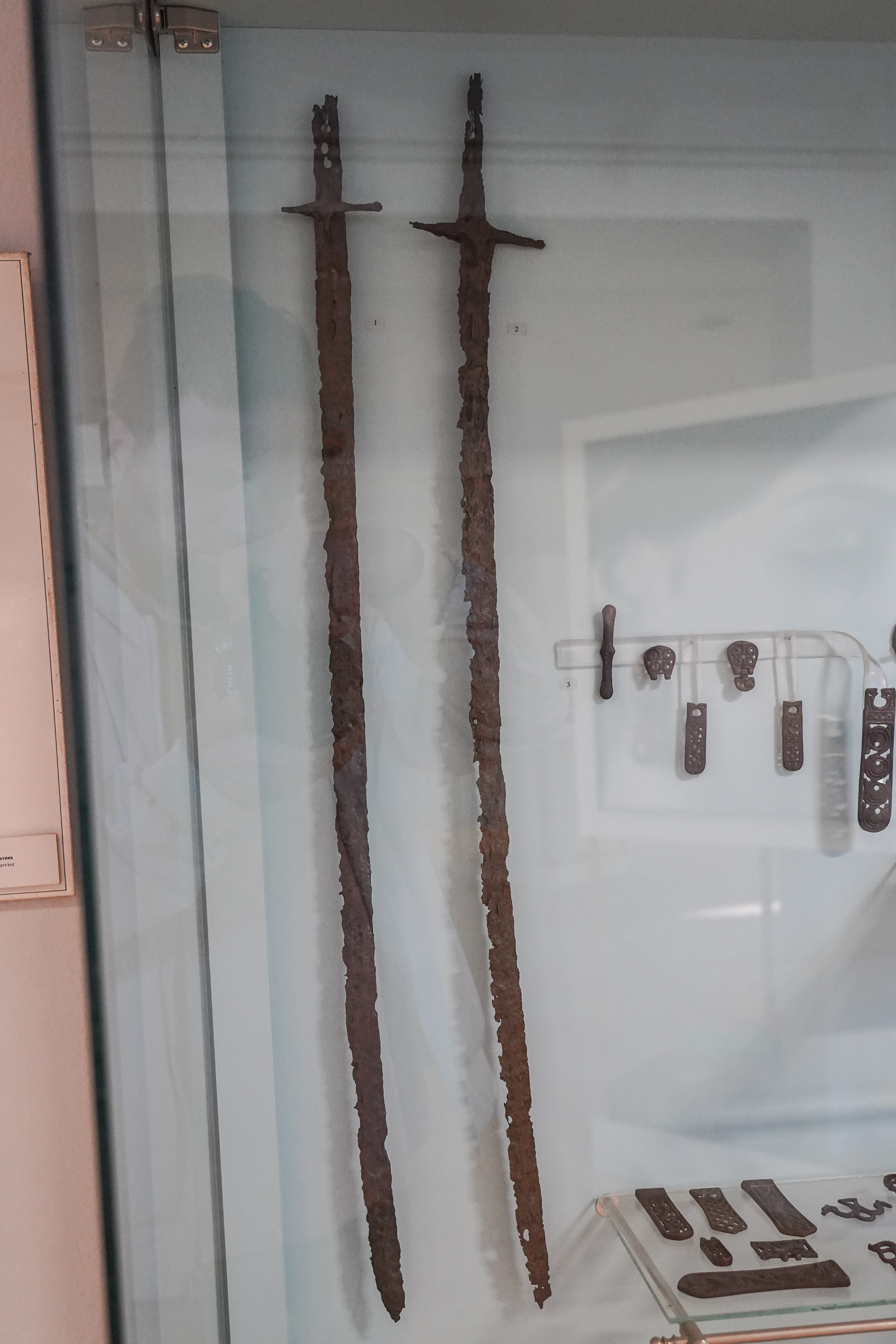
Unearthed 7th century swords

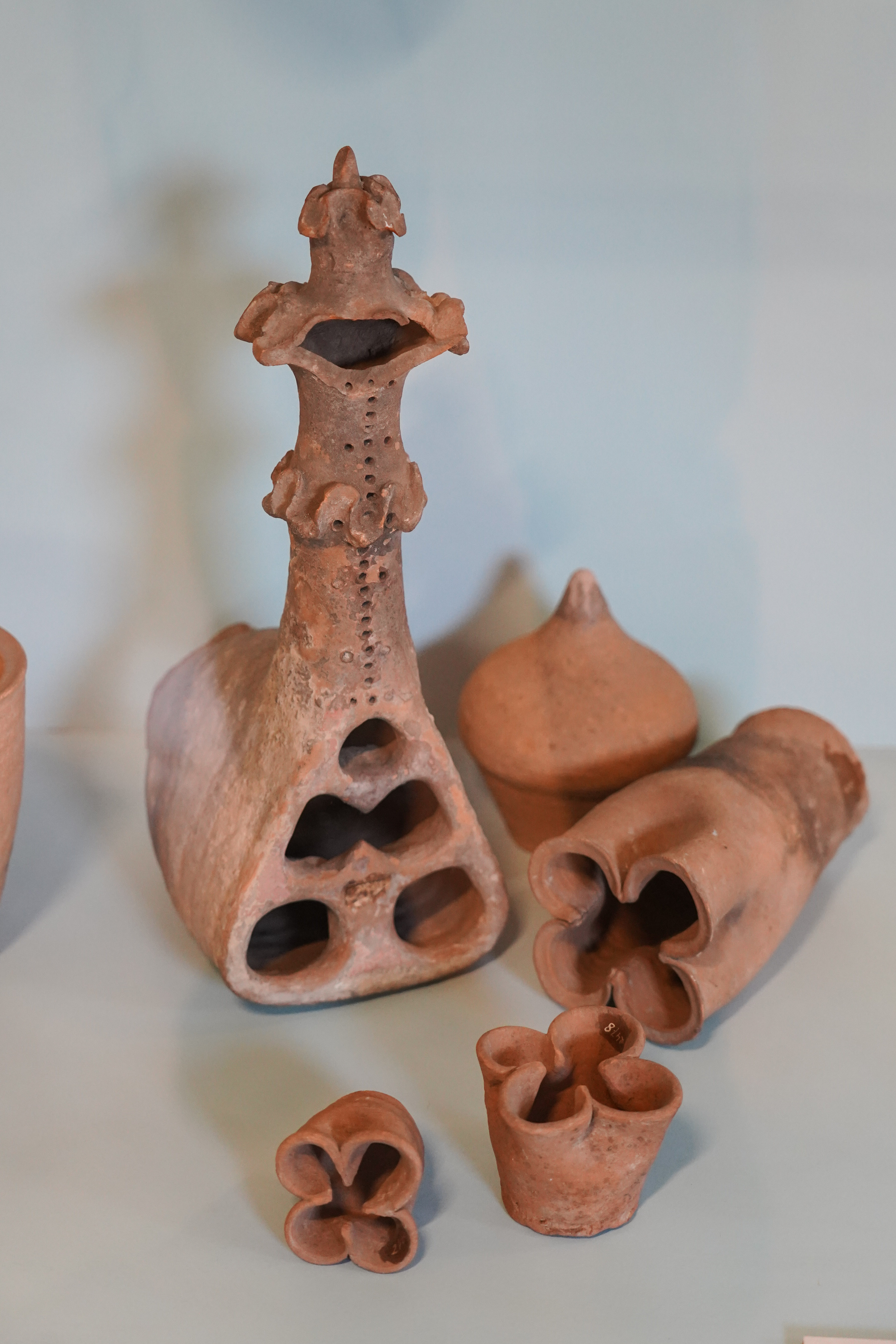
Various local pottery from the 12th century

== See also ==
- List of museums in Serbia
- Historical Archive of Sombor
