= Historical Archives of Srem =

Archive in Serbia

Coordinates: 44°58′02″N 19°36′28″E

- Историјски архив „Срем” (Serbian)

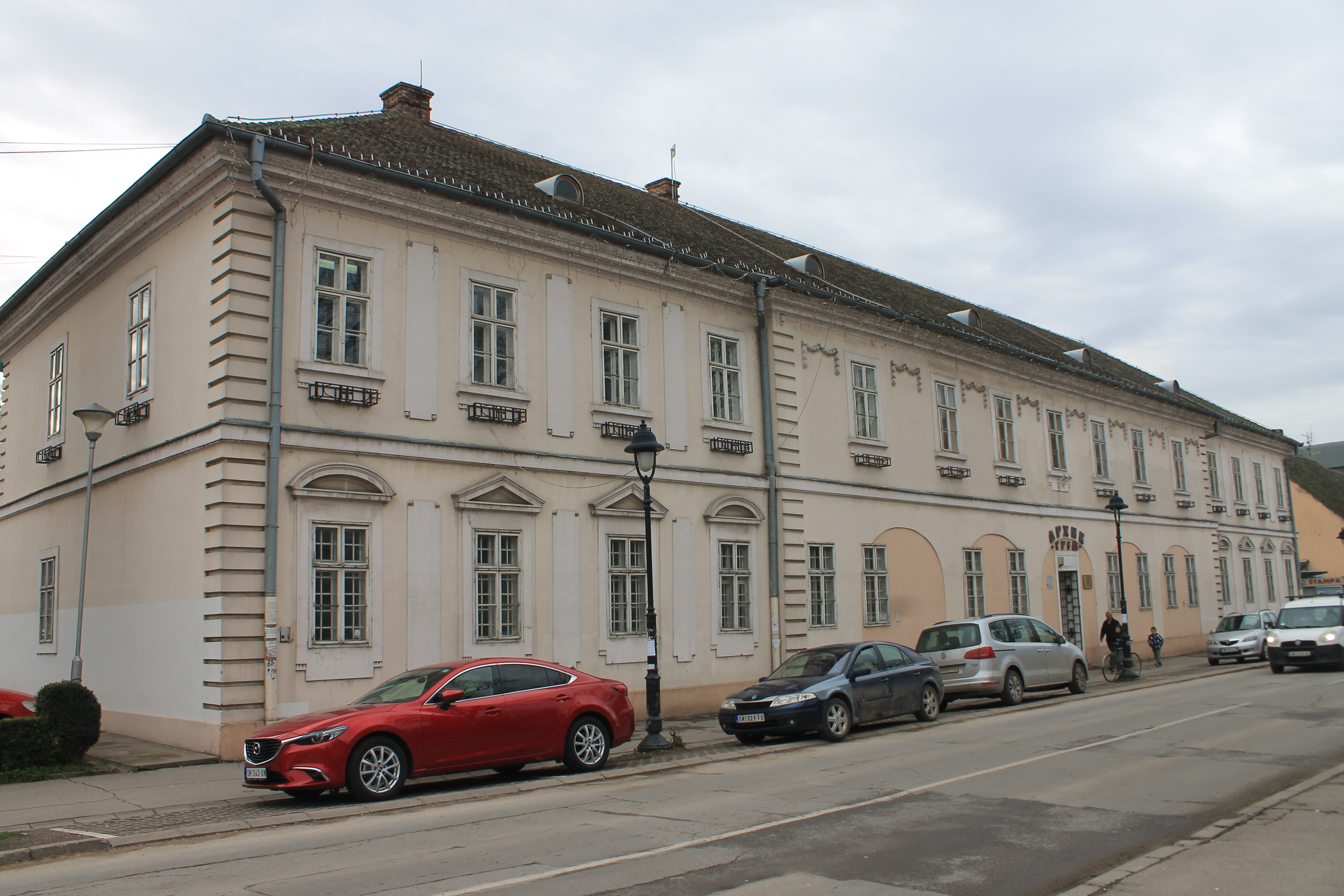

Agency overview
- Formed: 1946
- Jurisdiction: Government of Serbia
- Headquarters: Vuka Karadžića 4, 22 000 Sremska Mitrovica, Vojvodina, Serbia
- Parent agency: Archives of Vojvodina
- Website: Official website

Map
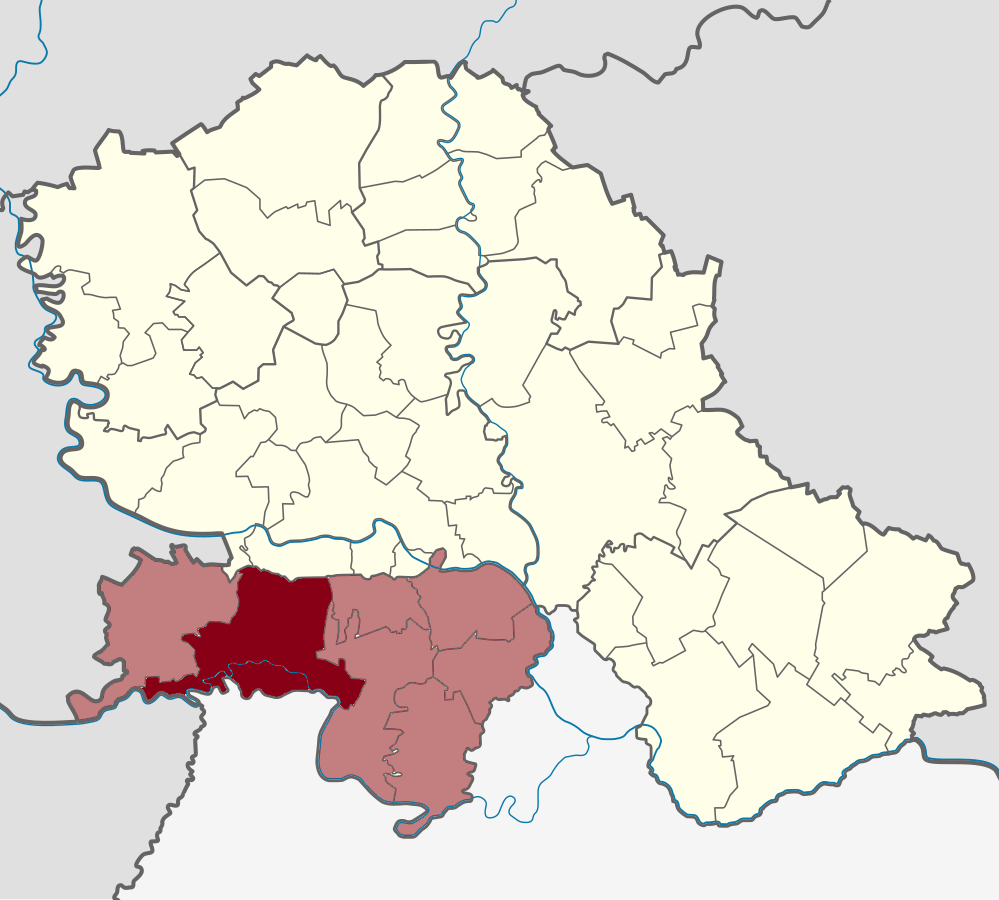
- Area served by the archives shown on the map of Vojvodina, Serbia

The Historical Archives of Srem (Serbian: Историјски архив „Срем”) in Sremska Mitrovica, Vojvodina, Serbia are the central archival institution responsible for collecting information about archival material in Srem District, administrative district overlapping with the historical region of Syrmia. The archives house approximately 1,300 various collections from different aspects of life in the region of Syrmia, including economy, judiciary, education, administration, socio-political and religious organizations.

The archives are the primary archival institution for municipal and local histories of Stara Pazova, Inđija, Irig, Šid, Ruma, Pećinci, and Sremska Mitrovica. One of the most important archival materials preserved by the institution are church registers from 1732 to 1900, which include Roman Catholic, Eastern Orthodox, Greek Catholic, and Jewish records from the region. Within its territorial jurisdiction, the archive conducts professional field supervision over 920 active registries (government bodies, local self-government bodies, institutions, cooperatives, and enterprises) which contain tens of thousands of linear meters of registry materials.

The archives are housed in a building constructed around 1700, which served as the headquarters of the 9th Border Regiment of the Petrovaradin Regiment of the Slavonian Military Frontier. The building is legally protected as a cultural monument and has been fully adapted for the needs of the archive through multiple renovations. Besides the central building, the archive uses two additional facilities for storage depots.

== See also ==
- List of archives in Serbia
- State Archives of Serbia
- Archives of Vojvodina
- Archives of Sremski Karlovci
- State Archives in Vukovar (in western Syrmia)
