= Olga Smederevac =

Serbian benefactor (1891–1973)

- Олга Смедеревац
- Smederevac in 1924
- Born: Olga Aleksić; 28 July 1891; Pančevo, Austria-Hungary
- Died: 22 August 1973 (aged 82); Pančevo, Yugoslavia
- Occupations: Benefactor; collector; activist; humanitarian; patron; custodian; pianist
- Known for: Salon Olge Smederevac
- Spouse: Stevan Smederevac (m. 1914; died 1957)

Olga Smederevac (née Aleksić; Serbian: Олга Смедеревац; 28 July 1891 – 22 August 1973) was a Serbian benefactor, art collector, and activist. Born in Pančevo, she came from the prominent trading Aleksić family and was educated at the Serbian Women's High School. She was the owner of Salon Olge Smederevac, which featured works of many painters and sculptors. Its common guests included prominent painters, writers, and composers. She was also a humanitarian and women's rights activist, having earned the Order of the Russian Red Cross. Married three times, her longest marriage was to Stevan Smederevac from 1914 until his death in 1957. She retired from public life after World War II and died in her birth home in 1973. Her legacy has been present in the National Museum of Pančevo since 1975 and a memorial plaque dedicated to her was installed on her birth home.

== Early life ==
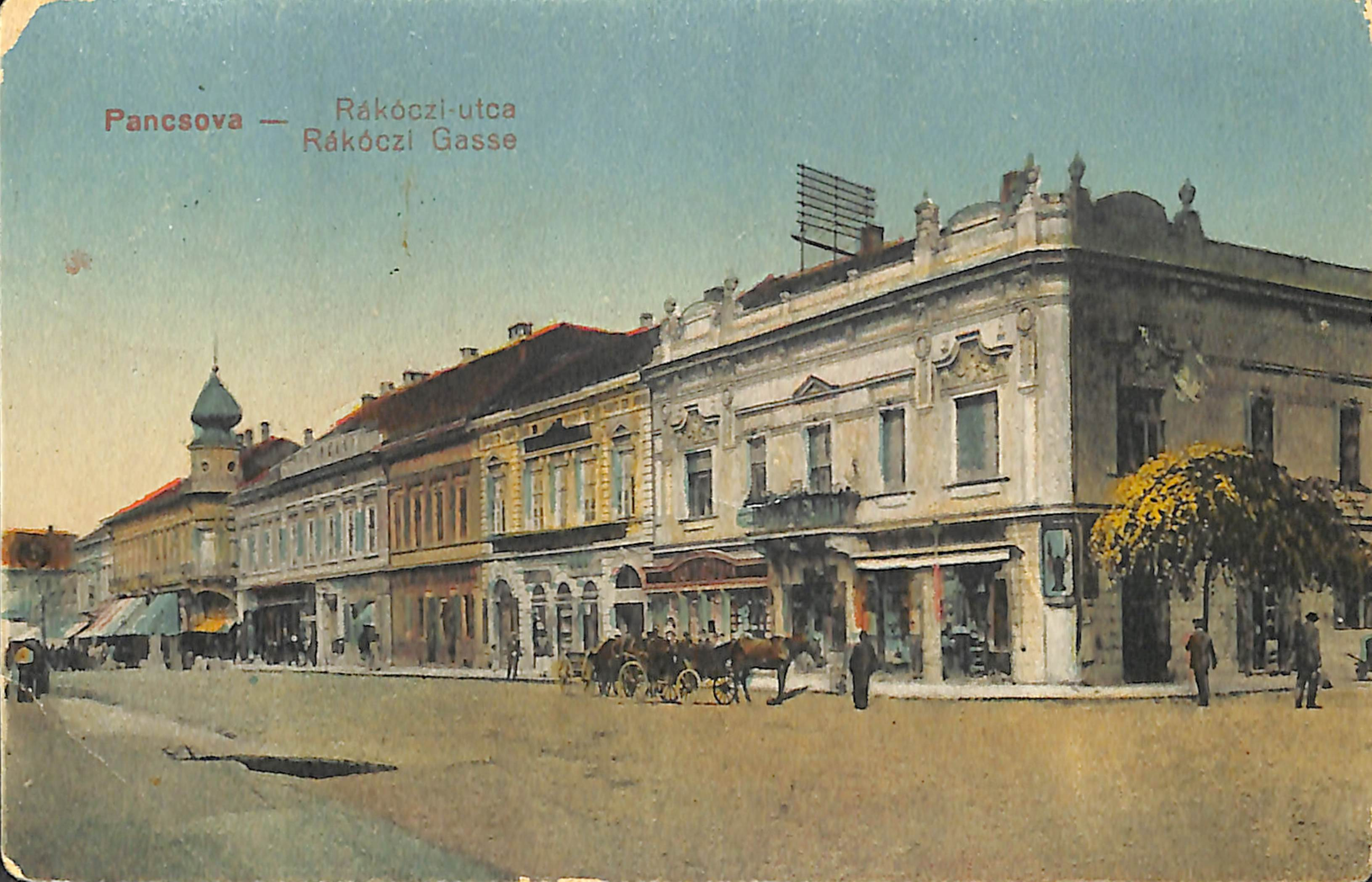
The home of the Aleksić family and the seat of the Salon of Olga Smederevac (furthest right building)

Olga Aleksić was born on 28 July 1891 (O.S. 16 July 1891) in Pančevo, Austria-Hungary, in the house at the corner of streets now-known as Vojvode Radomira Putnika and Vojvode Živojina Mišića. The house was built in the mid-19th century by the Kranjčević family and was soon bought by Pavle Aleksić. Originally from Banatsko Novo Selo, Olga's grandmother was Sofija (née Andrejević); their children were Milutin, Vladimir, and Marija Aleksić. As of the 21st century, the building houses the Gallery of Contemporary Arts. The Aleksić family was a prominent trading family from Pančevo.

Olga's parents were Milutin and Jovanka (née Jocić, died in 1922); she also had two sisters, Sofija (born in 1893) and Smilja (born in 1895). She was baptised on 5 August 1891 (O.S. 24 July 1891) in the Church of the Assumption of the Theotokos and grew up in a patriarchial family system. Her distant relative was Jovan Jovanović Zmaj, whom she called her grandfather. She was educated at the Serbian Women's High School in Pančevo and was a student of Isidora Sekulić.

== Career ==
Smederevac was primarily a benefactor, patron, art collector, activist, and custodian. She was the owner of Salon Olge Smederevac (lit. 'Salon of Olga Smederevac'); the institution also housed the Imrei and Andrejević families. The salon featured paintings of various artists, such as Marko Murat, Uroš Predić, Marino Tartaglia, and Petar Dobrović, and works of sculptors such as Ivan Meštrović, Risto Stijović, and Toma Rosandić. Murat, Predić, and Milan Butozan were common guests of the salon, as well as various composers, such as Jovan Bandur and Isidor Bajić, and writers, such as Sekulić, Milan Ćurčin, Miloš Crnjanski, and Mihovil Tomandl. The entrance to the building was from the street now-known as Vojvode Živojina Mišića. Featuring many books, magazines, and photographs, the salon also had a chess table. Visitors would read poetry, perform music, and talk about cultural topics. Considering that she had no kids, she devoted her life to humanitarian causes, having been a member of the Charitable Cooperative of Pančevo Serbs, Sokol Society, Cricle of Serbian Sisters, and the French Club; she was the vice-president of the latter organisation. She also took part in the Russian-Yugoslav Association, serving in 1937 as its vice-president.

During World War II, she took part in humantiarian missions. After the war, Smederevac retired from public life. She, however, helped restore the works of the National Museum of Pančevo from 1944 to 1948 and took part at the 100th anniversary since the foundation of the Uroš Predić Gymnasium in 1964. After the death of her husband, she fell sick; she had to sell her fortune to afford medicine.

== Personal life ==
Smederevac was fluent in French, German, Hungarian, and Russian and knew how to play a piano, often performing in public. For her humanitarian works, she was awarded the Order of the Russian Red Cross in Paris in 1935. She often travelled through Europe and advocated for equal rights for women. In the early 20th century, it was a norm for women to marry when they were young. Olga was first married to Armin Krevrat, a man from Turski Bečej, from 1908 to 1912, and then briefly to baron Batori. Olga then married the physician Stevan Smederevac on 21 February 1914 (O.S. 8 February 1914); the couple had no kids. Stevan died in November 1957 and was buried at the Old Orthodox Cemetery in Pančevo. Olga died on 22 August 1973 in her birth home.

== Legacy ==
Memorial plaque

Olga and Stevan were highly valued citizens of Pančevo. The academic Dejan Medaković wrote that her salon was very noble, having featured code of conduct. After Olga's death, the poet Desanka Maksimović wrote a song about her passing. She was one of the founders of the feminist movement in Pančevo. Beginning in 1975, her legacy was exhibited in the National Museum of Pančevo; it contains her 1924 portrait by Miloš Vušković, her bust by Pera Poček, portrait of Stevan Smederevac, and some paintings she owned.

In the 21st century, many women's organisations had shown interest in Smederevac's life; they created her a memorial plaque as a result, located on her birth home. In 2016, an exhibition was dedicated to her in the Gallery of Contemporary Arts. In 2017, a poll was conducted in the Uroš Predić Gymnasium in Pančevo in which none of the respondents knew anything about Smederevac. A street in Pančevo was named after her in 2019.

== Sources ==
- Perišić, Jovana S. (2017). "Olga Smederevac". In Cucić, Dragoljub (ed.). Zbornik radova: prilozi istoriji grada Pančeva [Collection of works: contributions to the history of the city of Pančevo] (in Serbian). Pančevo: Regionalni centar za talente "Mihailo Pupin". pp. 67–103. ISBN 978-86-87223-10-3.
