= National Museum of Pančevo =

Museum in Pančevo, Vojvodina

- Народни музеј Панчево
- Museum in 2021
- Established: 23 December 1923
- Location: Pančevo, Serbia
- Coordinates: 44.8714228°N 20.6403313°E
- Director: Miroslav Prvulj
- Website: www.muzejpancevo.rs

National Museum of Pančevo (Serbian: Народни музеј Панчево, romanized: Narodni muzej Pančevo, lit. 'People's Museum Pančevo') is a museum in Pančevo, Vojvodina. Founded in 1923, the museum has for most of its existence occupied the Magistrate Building, the former offices of the local government. The classicist building was constructed between 1833 and 1838; at its entrance, there is a clock and a Latin inscription. It is listed as a monument of great importance.

The current director is Miroslav Prvulj. The museum has departments for ethnology, history, art history, and archaeology and it regularly organises exhibitions. The Serbian Vojvodina flag from 1848, as well as the original Migration of the Serbs painting by Paja Jovanović are located in the museum.

== History ==
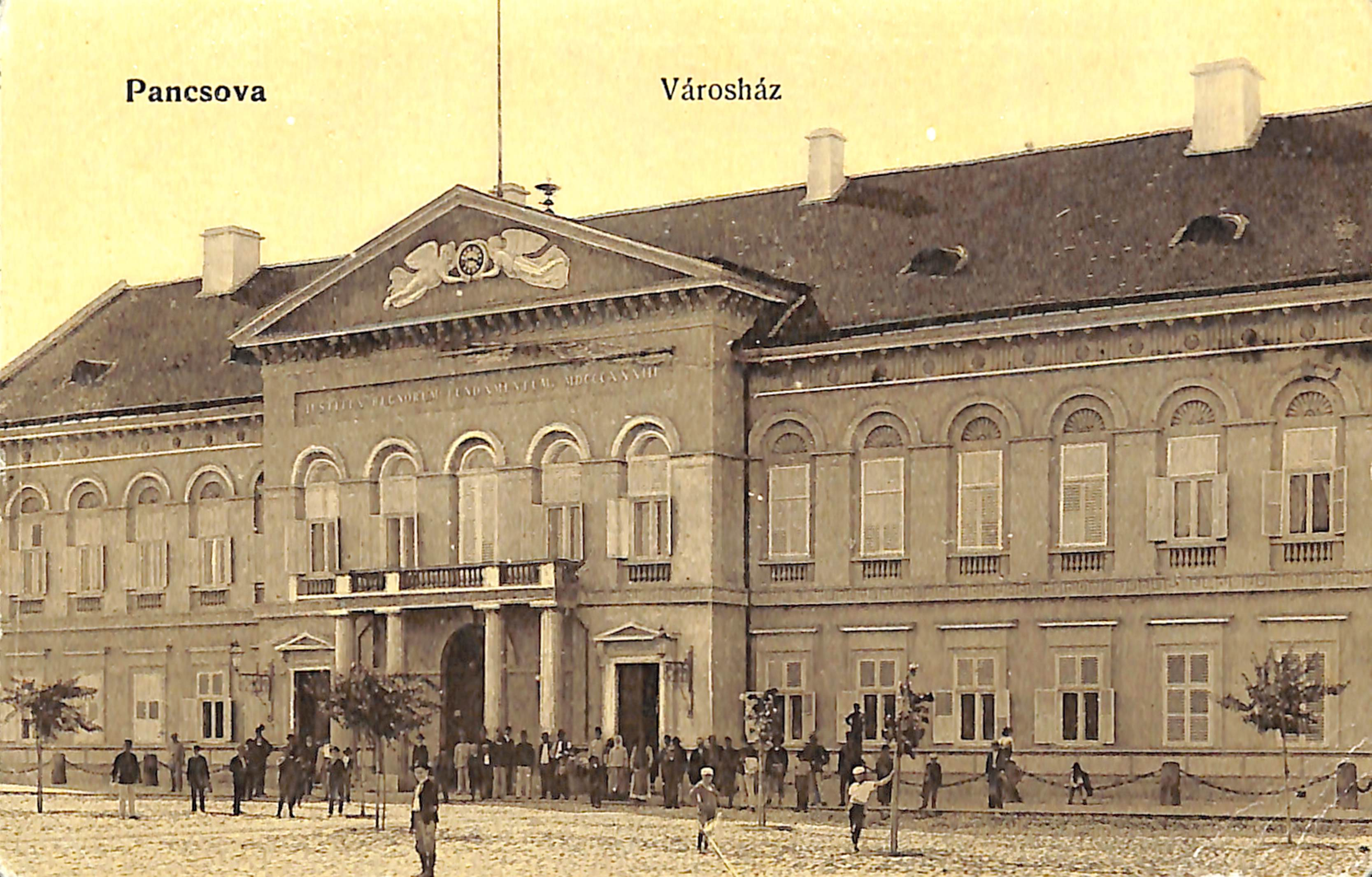
The Magistrate in the early 20th century

Founded on 23 December 1923 by the decree of mayor Vladimir Margan and the City Senate, the National Museum of Pančevo is seated in the Magistrate building. Until then, the city never had a museum, but had groups of enthusiasts who collected archaeological material. The People's Bank also owned some of the material. The professor Borislav Jankulov, together with several well-known Pančevo citizens, initiated the founding of the museum; he began collecting material in 1918. Initially, the museum only occupied a few rooms in the Magistrate, but was later expanded by Jankulov, when he became the museum's director, in the 1930s. Between 1946 and 1948, it was situated in Graničarska kuća (lit. 'Border Guard House'), where the first post-World War II exhibition was held. In 1948, it was moved to Svetosavski dom (lit. 'Sveti Sava House'), where the painter Uroš Predić held his final exhibition in 1950. After World War II, the museum was renamed from City Museum to the current name.

With the help of the historian Mihovil Tomandl and the collector Olga Smederevac, the museum slowly returned to the Magistrate building in 1965. A permanent exhibition was opened in 1971 and since 1982, the museum has occupied the entire Magistrate building. In 1973, for the museum's 50th anniversary, a monograph was published, authored by Milena Reljić. The celebratory event was attended by Slobodanka Roksić, the mayor of Pančevo. In 1979, the museum held an exhibition about its acquisitions from 1976 to 1978, announcing that it obtained over 683 new items for its collection, with most of them being donations.

In 1983, for the museum's 60th anniversary, an exhibition about the museum's acquisitions between 1978 and 1983 was organised. During that period, the museum had collected 398 new archaeological items, with most of the items coming from the archaeological site of Opovo-Ugar. The art history department was also expanded with 135 new items. In 2023, for its 100th anniversary, the museum held an exhibition about the museum's acquisitions from 1984 to 2023. This was the first exhibition about the museum's acquisitions since 1983. As of 2026, the director of the museum is Miroslav Prvulj.

== Architecture ==
The clock on the Magistrate Building, which was repaired in 2025

The museum occupies a building in the city centre known as the Magistrate Building, which formerly housed the local government until the 1960s. It is located in the King Peter I Square. Besides the museum, the building has also been previously partly occupied by the Pančevo City Library and the Historical Archives of Pančevo. Its construction started in 1833 and was completed in 1838. The construction worker Hajman planned the building, while Franja Dobi and Fridrih Kverfeld (Friedrich Querfeld) built the building. The building was constructed to resemble the Cyrillic letter P (П).

The building consists of lower and upper floors. Built in the classicist style, it was later expanded with two courtyard wings. In 2015, parts of the Magistrate building were repaired. The clock that sits on top of the entrance of the building was installed in 1900 and repaired in May 2025. There is also an inscription in Latin, Justitia fundamentum regnorum (Justice is the foundation of the state).

The Magistrate has been given the label of a cultural monument of great importance by the government in 1948. It is often used as a filming location by foreign and Serbian filmmakers.

== Content and exhibitions ==
The National Museum of Pančevo houses several important acquisitions, such as the Serbian Vojvodina flag from 1848, the original Migration of the Serbs painting by Paja Jovanović, as well as archaeological material, paintings, and letters, such as those related to the Starčevo and Vinča cultures. There are several departments in the museum, such as those related to ethnology, history, art history, and archaeology. There is also a library. The museum also regularly organises exhibitions. In 2016, the museum received a donation of several thousand books. Ten years later, in July 2026, the legacy of the Aleksić family from Pančevo, which included paintings and material related to applied arts, was donated to the museum. Legacies of painters Stojan Trumić, Zoran Petrović, Slavko Pavlov, and the Smederevac family are also located in the museum.

Since 1989, the museum has published Glasnik muzeja Banata (lit. 'Bulletin of the Banat Museum'), which is a collective bulletin of museums in Pančevo, Vršac, Kikinda, Zrenjanin, and Bela Crkva.

== Sources ==
- Bauer, Antun (1974). "Pedeset godina Narodnog muzeja u Pančevu : 1923-1973" [Fifty years of the National Museum in Pančevo: 1923-1973.]. Informatica museologica (in Croatian). 5 (25): 5–6.
- Bauer, Antun (1983). "Proslava 60-godišnjice Narodnog muzeja u Pančevu" [Celebration of the 60th anniversary of the National Museum in Pančevo]. Informatica museologica (in Croatian). 14 (3–4): 28–29.
- Janković, Olivera (1974). "Pedeset godina Narodnog muzeja u Pančevu" [Fifty years of the National Museum in Pančevo]. Informatica museologica (in Croatian). 5 (25): 6–7.
- Janković, Olivera (1979). "Nove akvizicije Narodnog muzeja u Pančevu" [New acquisitions of the National Museum in Pančevo]. Informatica museologica (in Croatian). 10 (2–3): 76–77.
- Njegovan, Drago; Mustedanagić, Lidija, eds. (2016). Vodič kroz muzeje Srbije [A Guide to the Museums of Serbia] (in Serbian). Muzejsko društvo Srbije. ISBN 978-86-908131-6-2.
