= Mihovil Tomandl =

Yugoslav historian (1894–1963)

- Миховил Томандл
- Tomandl in 1940
- Born: 19 April 1894; Brčko, Austria-Hungary
- Died: 21 May 1963 (aged 69); Pančevo, Yugoslavia
- Resting place: Catholic Cemetery, Pančevo; 44.8734489°N 20.6529873°E
- Education: University of Vienna; University of Zagreb (LL.D.)
- Occupations: Historian; librarian; writer; lawyer; journalist
- Known for: Contributions to the Pančevo City Library

Mihovil Tomandl (Serbian Cyrillic: Миховил Томандл; 19 April 1894 – 21 May 1963) was a Yugoslav historian and librarian who is best known for his contributions to the Pančevo City Library, serving as its director from 1944 to 1953. Born in Brčko, Tomandl was of Croatian and Czech descent and studied across many locations in Yugoslavia. During the interwar period, he worked as a lawyer in Pančevo, contributed to the newspaper Pančevac, served in the City Senate, and was a member of the French Club and the Pančevo Church Choir. He was jailed during both world wars, having been sent to the Svilara concentration camp during World War II.

During the liberation of Pančevo in 1944, Tomandl was instructed by communists to re-found the Pančevo City Library with some associates. They collected around 25,000 books before the library was opened to the public in 1946. During his tenure, the number of books in the library was vastly expanded. He also held lectures for librarians and participated in librarianship tournaments. He was promoted to the position of a senior librarian in 1951 before stepping down as the director of the institution in 1953. Between 1953 and 1959, he worked at the Historical Archives of Pančevo. Tomandl authored around 110 works, mostly about Vojvodina and regional history. He died in 1963 and was buried at the Catholic Cemetery in Pančevo. A street was named in his honour in 2019 and an autobiography was published by Matica srpska in 2021.

== Early life and career ==
Born on 19 April 1894 in Brčko, Bosnia and Herzegovina, Mihovil Tomandl was of Croatian descent from his maternal side, while he was Czech from his paternal side. His father, Josip, was born in Titel, Vojvodina, while Katarina, his mother, was born in Novi Sad but her family was from Rijeka, Croatia. He spent his early childhood and studies in Bosanska Gradiška, Zemun, and Zagreb. In 1912, he was the secretary of a general strike in the I Gymnasium high school in Zagreb. During World War I, he was jailed in Arad. He studied law at faculties in the University of Vienna and Zagreb, ultimately finishing his doctorate in Zagreb in 1923. In Vienna, he participated in many student protests. He moved to Pančevo after finishing his studies. There, he initially worked as a teacher in the State Gymnasium, and later as a court clerk and judge of the District Court in Pančevo. He was a trainee lawyer until 1925, after which he earned the title of a lawyer, the occupation he held until 1941.

In the 1920s, he became an editor for the newspaper Pančevac, while he also contributed to the magazine Narodna sloga, which he co-founded in 1924. He had also cooperated with various magazines and newspapers from Pančevo, Belgrade, and Novi Sad. He was a member of the Matica srpska institution and Serbian Academy of Sciences and Arts, as well as an associate editor for the Encyclopedia of Yugoslavia and the Music Encyclopedia. During the Interwar period, he served as a member of the City Senate. Tomandl was also an active member of the French Club, which helped fund the construction of the Monument of Gratitude to France in Kalemegdan, Belgrade in 1930. He also took part in the Pančevo Church Choir. An anti-fascist, he was sent to the Svilara concentration camp in Pančevo during World War II.

== Pančevo City Library ==
The City Library building (on the right) was located at the Zmaj Jove Jovanovića 5 street during his tenure as director

The Banat Military Administration, headed by the Yugoslav Partisans, initiated the re-founding of the Pančevo City Library on 15 September 1944, putting Tomandl as the director. The military administration had advised Tomandl and associates to collect all books and museum objects from abandoned homes, including the ones formerly occupied by fascists. By the end of the year, they had collected around 20,000 books and many images, despite having trouble with finding vehicles. Citizens also donated their own books. According to Pančevac, around 108 horse-drawn vehicles were brought to the location of the new library at the Zmaj Jove Jovanovića 5 street, where the Srpska Čitaonica (lit. 'Serbian Reading Room') library was located before the war. Tomandl was a visitor of Srpska Čitaonica during the interwar period. Another 5,000 books were moved to the city library in July 1945 from the library of the Magistrate, as well as cabinets and shelves from the same institution.

The city library was opened to the public on 2 November 1946. During the first decade after its re-founding, Tomandl was helped by the local government with the overall work for the library. In a 1947 report, the city library had three departments, a filing room, office, and anteroom. The library was open on Monday, Wednesday, and Friday to all citizens over the age of 15. It also lacked professional staff. Most of the books were in German, followed by Hungarian and then Serbian. Besides Tomandl, Mirjana Stepić was employed as an associate and Ilija Gomboš as a caretaker. They had the help of Marija Seneši, a teacher from the Uroš Predić Gymnasium. In 1948, Tomandl asked the local government to employ a library technician and two honorary workers due to the large expansion of their collection of books. The same year, the library announced that it had collected 30,000 books in total.

During his stint as the director of the library, Tomandl held lectures for librarians, participated in librarianship tournaments, and worked as a researcher and author for the journal Letopis Matice srpske. In March 1949, he organised a librarianship course in Pančevo, which was attended by 17 people. As a participant in librarianship tournaments, he helped open libraries in Vojvodina, increase the number of books in libraries, organise literary evenings, create mobile libraries, as well as improve the looks of libraries. As the director of the city library, Tomandl also had to take care of other libraries in Pančevo and Alibunar, including the library of the Serbian Orthodox Church in Pančevo.

In 1951, on his birthday, Tomandl became a senior librarian. However, according to reports, he was not happy with his job in the 1950s, describing him as nervous. By the end of his mandate, the library obtained a reading room. In 1953, Tomandl was appointed director of the Historical Archives of Pančevo, ending his stint as the director of the City Library. He remained the director of the institution until 1955, after which he worked as an associate until his retirement in 1959.

== Personal life ==
Tomandl's tombstone

Besides Serbo-Croatian, Tomandl also spoke German, Italian, Hungarian, and French. Tomandl was briefly a member of the Yugoslav Democratic Party, identifying as a Yugoslav of liberal democratic orientation. He was not a member of the Communist Party of Yugoslavia, although he did identify as an anti-fascist. After leaving the Democratic Party, he identified himself as a member of the Independent Democratic Party. Tomandl died on 21 May 1963 in Pančevo. He was buried at the city's Catholic Cemetery.

== Legacy ==
As the director of the Pančevo City Library, Tomandl helped save the collections of Magistrate Library, the People's Bank, Association of German Businesses, as well as tens of thousands of books from private households. The Pančevo City Library librarian Goran Trailović wrote that Tomandl was dedicated to his work at the library and that under his tenure, the library made profits from written-off books and membership fees. The library was also greatly expanded. Olga Janković of the newspaper Politika described Tomandl as having a "versatile, almost renaissance personality" (Serbian: "svestrana, gotovo renesansna ličnost"). The historian Ivana Spasović wrote that Tomandl left an impressive oeuvre, but that he remained insufficiently known in the history of Pančevo. She added that Tomandl was remembered as a distinguished journalist and an honourable man. In 2019, a street was named in his honour in Pančevo.

== Bibliography ==
Tomandl authored around 110 works, with most of his works related to Vojvodina and regional history. He began his publicist career before World War I, as an editor for the Novi Sad newspaper Branik. He wrote about 10 monographs and biographies of well-known people, about World War I, and Pančevo in the First Serbian Uprising and the Revolutions of 1848. Janković wrote that his most important books include Spomenica Pančevačkog srpskog crkvenog pevačkog društva and the two-volume book Istorija pozorišta u Vojvodini. Tomandl was also a translator, translating the communist work of Eduard Palyi.

His works include:

- Izbori dr Mihaila Polita-Desančića u Banatskoj Granici i Miletićev bašaahidski poraz i titelski izbor 1875. (1934)
- Spomenica pančevačkog Srpskog crkvenog pevačkog društva 1838–1938 (1938)
- Dr Svetislav Kasapinović (1940)
- Dragomir Krančević [violinist] (1951)
- Imena i brojevi (1951)
- Udeo naših kompozitora u razvitku Srpskog narodnog pozorišta (1951)
- Srpsko crkveno-školsko pozorište u XVIII veku (1952)
- Srpsko svetovno školsko pozorište (1952)
- Pozorište Joakima Vujića (1952)
- Pozorište Nikole Đurkovića (1952)
- Dragomir Krančević [singer, actor, and director] (1952)
- Prvi srpski pozorišni kompozitor Aksentije Maksimović (1952)
- Dr Jovan Paču (1952)
- Period Letećeg diletantskog pozorišta (1953)
- Pitanje pozorišne zgrade u Pančevu 1842 (1953)
- Vasa Živković i Srpsko narodno pozorište (1954)
- Srpsko pozorište u Vojvodini (1951, 1954)
- Nevolje Srpskog narodnog pozorišta do Prvog svetskog rata (1961)
- Repertoar i gostovanja Srpskog narodnog pozorišta u Novom Sadu od 1861. do 1914. godine (1961)
- Život i rad Konstantina Peičića (1966)

Some of his republished works include:

- Istorija Pančeva: povodom 850 godina grada Pančeva. Historical Archives of Pančevo. 2003. ISBN 86-83347-10-9.
- Pančevo i Prvi srpski ustanak. Historical Archives of Pančevo. 2004. ISBN 86-83347-09-5.
- Pančevo za vreme Prvog svetskog rata: 1914-1918. Historical Archives of Pančevo. 2014. ISBN 978-86-6279-006-4.
- Istorija Pančeva. Historical Archives of Pančevo. 2020. ISBN 978-86-6279-017-0.

Matica srpska published his autobiography in 2021 and kept it until its release. Most of the autobiography is related to his school years from 1910 to 1913, while there is also content about his life during the interwar period. Despite his long tenure at the City Library, there is little to no information about it in the autobiography. Ivana Spasović, who worked on editing his autobiography, worked on republishing some of his books through the Historical Archives of Pančevo, beginning in the early 2000s.

- Tomandl, Mihovil (2021). Spasović, Ivana B.; Karanović, Branislav (eds.). Autobiografija [Autobiography] (in Serbian). Novi Sad: Matica srpska. ISBN 978-86-7946-349-4.

== Sources ==
- Dragosavac, Branka (2021). "Prvi posleratni upravnik Gradske biblioteke u Pančevu - Mihovil Tomandl: Autobiografija, Matica srpska, Novi Sad, 2021" [The first post-war manager of the City Library in Pančevo - Mihovil Tomandl: Autobiography, Matica srpska, Novi Sad, 2021]. Čitalište: naučni časopis za teoriju i praksu bibliotekarstva (in Serbian). 39: 98–100.
- Trailović, Goran (6 April 2022), "Gradski bibliotekar dr Mihovil Tomandl (1944–1953)" [City Librarian Mihovil Tomandl, PhD (1944–1953)], Biblioteke i identitet: Zbornik radova sa Naučnog skupa održanog 24. maja 2021. godine u Pančevu (Conference paper) (in Serbian), Pančevo: Pančevo City Library, pp. 59–78, doi:10.5281/zenodo.6419851
