= Svilara concentration camp =

Concentration camp in Pančevo

- Concentration camp
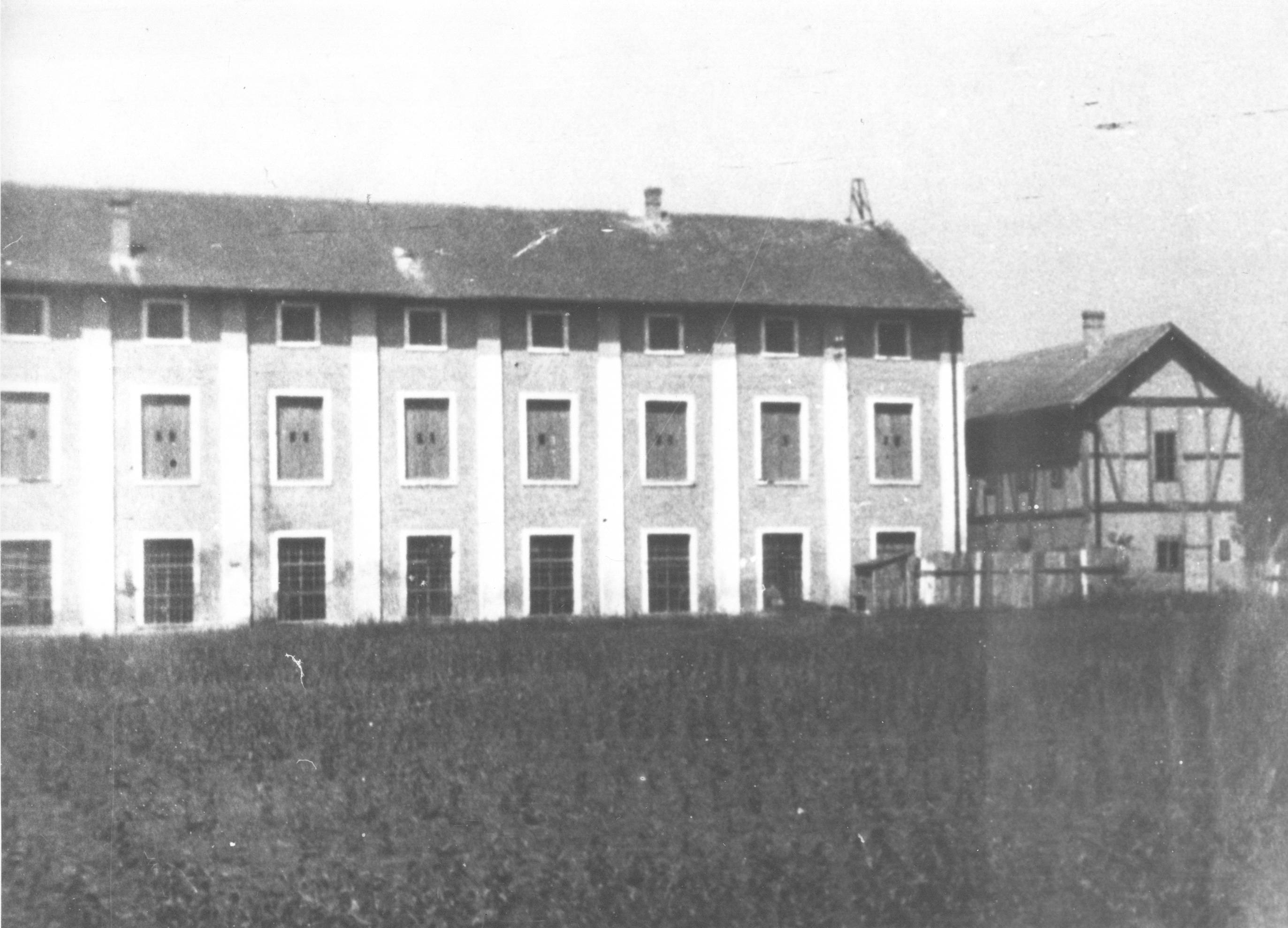
- The Old Svilara complex, with building one on the right and two on the left
- Coordinates: 44.8691293°N 20.6540015°E
- Known for: First concentration camp in Banat
- Location: Pančevo, Serbia
- Operated by: Nazi Germany
- Original use: Magnanery
- Operational: June–November 1941
- Number of inmates: between 500 and 1,600
- Notable inmates: Marko Kulić; Mihovil Tomandl

The Svilara concentration camp (Serbian: Логор Свилара, Logor Svilara) was a Nazi German concentration camp in Pančevo, German-occupied Serbia. Established in June 1941, it existed until September, October, or November 1941. The camp was guarded by local Germans, which included prisoners such as communists, Jews, and resistance members. They were often subject to torture, while some of the inmates, such as Marko Kulić, were murdered in the camp. After the camp was closed, some inmates were moved to Mala Kasarna (lit. 'Small Barrack'), also in Pančevo.

The camp previously housed the first magnanery in Pančevo, with the first building having been built in 1836 and the second one in 1889. The buildings are now referred to as Old Svilara (Serbian: Стара свилара, Stara svilara) and are listed as an immovable cultural property. In 1951, a memorial plaque was put on one of the buildings.

== History ==
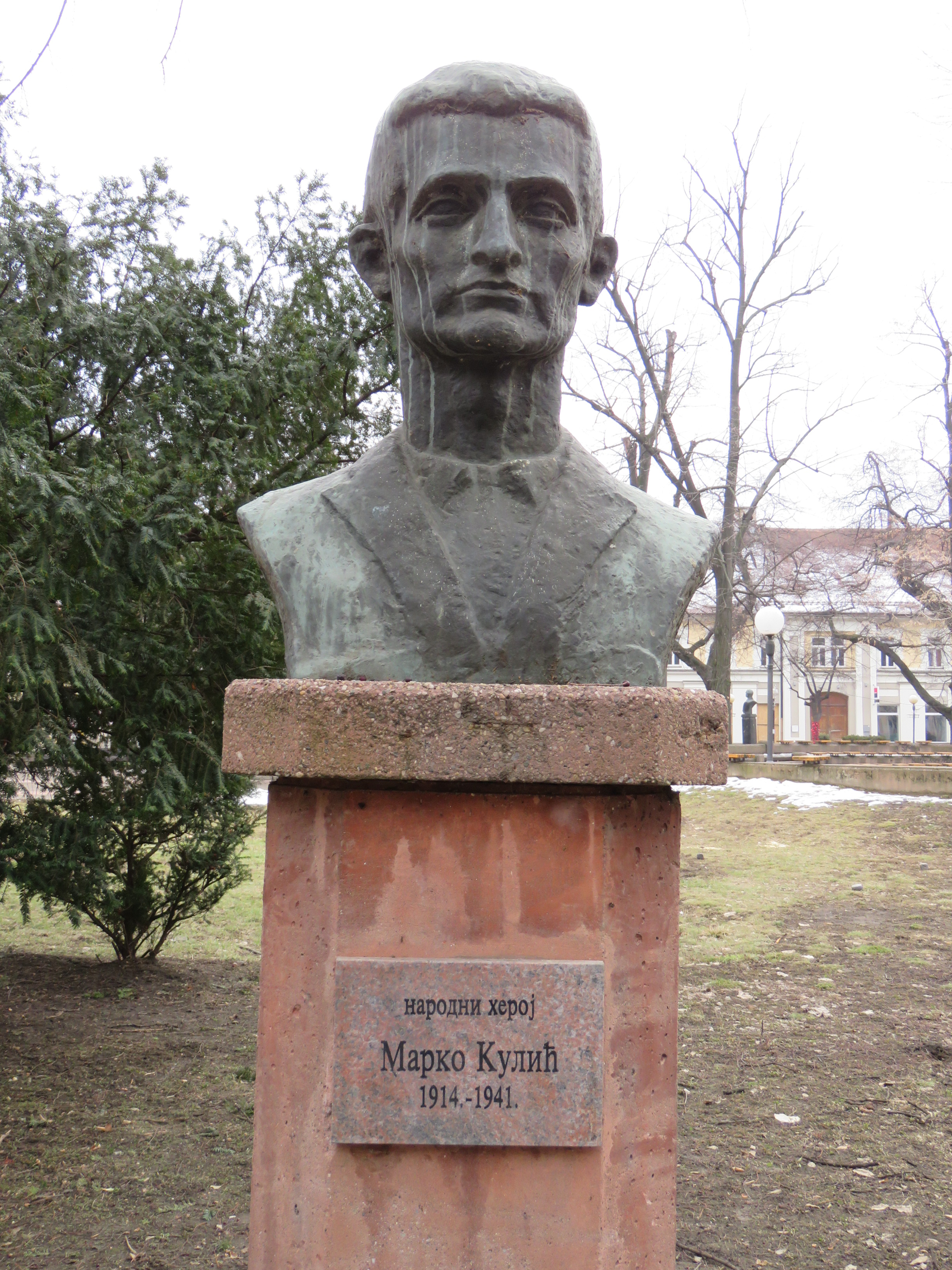
Marko Kulić's bust at the King Peter I Square in Pančevo

After Nazi Germany occupied Serbia, they established a concentration camp in Svilara, Pančevo, the first one in Banat. The camp was opened on 22 June 1941. It was founded by Mihajlo Rajzer, a Gestapo officer and former teacher from Kraljevićevo, while his deputy was Peter Hans Petrović, a trader from Pančevo. Other prominent leaders of the camp included Bela Huterer, the leader of the German National Group, Oskar Kreveć, the head of the police, and Frans Keler Žoli, a camp guard commander. Nazi Germany opened the camp in preparation of the Soviet invasion of Germany, thinking that the camp would quell the resistance in Pančevo.

Banat Swabians, who were Germans living in Banat, commanded the camp and they rotated every 20 days. The camp consisted of two buildings, which had poor protection against the cold and small windows that would make the rooms half-dark. The first batch of inmates were brought to the camp on 23 June, around 200 of them. The camp contained communists, Jews, and resistance members; Germans called them "nationalist elements" and "political culprits". They were often locked into the factory's stable and warehouse, which were poorly managed. Women convicted of higher crimes were locked into the factory's hay shed. Camp guards molested the prisoners in the camp, while they tortured them in a different building. Common torture methods included beatings, hair burning, nail pulling, whipping, placing hot metal eggs under their arms, and clamping their heads. This would often last several hours until the prisoners became unconscious. Camp guards would also often jump onto the prisoners, making them vomit and defecate. According to the historian Srđan Božović, communists received the worst punishments, which he called "medieval-like". Witnesses have said that passers-by and people who lived nearby would often hear screams coming from the camp.

As was typical of concentration camps in Serbia, inmates were used for their labour, with women in the camp enlisted in spinning yarn. Prisoners would wake up early, clean their rooms, and be sent to work in the camp. People from Vršac, Bela Crkva, and other places from Banat were brought to the camp. Between 500 and 1,600 people were imprisoned, including Marko Kulić, a shoemaker and a Communist Party of Yugoslavia (KPJ) member, Bogdan Petrović, also a member of KPJ, and Đura Filipov, a student from Pločica. Mihovil Tomandl, the future director of the Pančevo City Library, was also a notable inmate. Kulić was one of the inmates who were murdered in the camp on 31 July, as well as Filipov. Most prisoners were freed, while around 100 were moved to a different building, known as Mala Kasarna (lit. 'Small Barrack') (Note: Mala Kasarna was most likely built in the late 18th century and was demolished in 1973, where the Pančevo Bus Station is now located, at the intersection of Sveti Sava, Vojvode Radomira Putnika, and Oslobođenja streets.) where living conditions were slightly better. Ultimately, around 30 communists were moved by November to the Banjica concentration camp, where they were killed on 9 May 1942. The concentration camp also served as a deportation camp to other camps in Serbia, such as the Sajmište concentration camp.

The camp was either closed in September 1941, late October, or by the middle of November. Mala Kasarna was, however, still used sometimes as a detention camp during 1942. Svilara was either closed after the deportation of Banat Jews, or, according to Božović, was closed to stop the potential revolt among Pančevo citizens.

== Architecture ==
The concentration camp was housed in two buildings in Pančevo, that are as of 2014, listed as an immovable cultural property. The buildings previously housed the silk industry in Pančevo. The first building was built in 1836 and served as the first silk mill in Pančevo, while the second building was built in 1889. The first building contains a basement, ground floor and the first floor, while the second building contains a ground floor, the first floor, and an attic. Both buildings were timber-framed. The buildings are now known as Old Svilara (Serbian: Стара свилара, Stara svilara), to distinguish with the silk factory at Tamiš, now known as Svilara (lit. 'Magnanery'), which was built in 1899.

== Legacy ==
Memorial plaque

Svilara is one of the three sites where prisoners were murdered by Nazis in Pančevo, the other two being Stratište (lit. 'execution site'), and another execution site near Deliblato. The Jewish Municipality of Pančevo said that before the liberation of Pančevo, the Nazi occupiers destroyed evidence of extermination of prisoners in Pančevo. According to their estimation, around 12 to 15 thousand prisoners were murdered at Stratište.

Kulić was posthumously given the Order of the People's Hero. In 1951, a memorial plaque was put on one of the buildings.

== Sources ==
- Božović, Srđan; Radanović, Milan (11 June 2014). Svilara – Prvi nacistički logor u Banatu [Svilara – The first Nazi camp in Banat] (Video) (in Serbian). ForumFPI – via YouTube.
- Janjetović, Zoran (2018). Forced Labour in Serbia. Producers, Consumers and Consequences of Forced Labour 1941–1944. Center for Holocaust Research and Education. ISBN 978-86-81246-05-4.
- Kačavenda, Petar, ed. (1989). Logor Banjica 1941–1944 [Banjica Concentration Camp 1941–1944] (in Serbian) (1st ed.). Institute for Contemporary History.
- Popov, Branislav (1992). Kačavenda, Petar (ed.). Nemački zatvori i koncentracioni logori u Banatu 1941 – 1944 [German prisons and concentration camps in Banat 1941 - 1944] (in Serbian). Institute for Contemporary History. ISBN 86-7403-051-3.
- Kačavenda, Petar (1994). "Zločini nemačke okupacione vojske i folksdojčera nad Srbima u Banatu 1941.-1944. godine" [Crimes of the German occupation army and Volksdeutsche against Serbs in Banat 1941–1944]. Istorija 20. veka (in Serbian). 2: 91–99.
- Momčilović, Đorđe (1977). Banat u narodnooslobodilačkom ratu [Banat in the national liberation war] (in Serbian). Vojnoizdavački zavod.
- Zakić, Mirna (2017). Ethnic Germans and National Socialism in Yugoslavia in World War II. Cambridge University Press. ISBN 9781107171848.
