= Historical Archives of Bela Crkva =

- Историјски архив Бела Црква (Serbian); Arhiva Istorică a Bela Crkva (Romanian); Béla Crkva Történeti Levéltára (Hungarian); Historický archiv Bela Crkva (Czech)

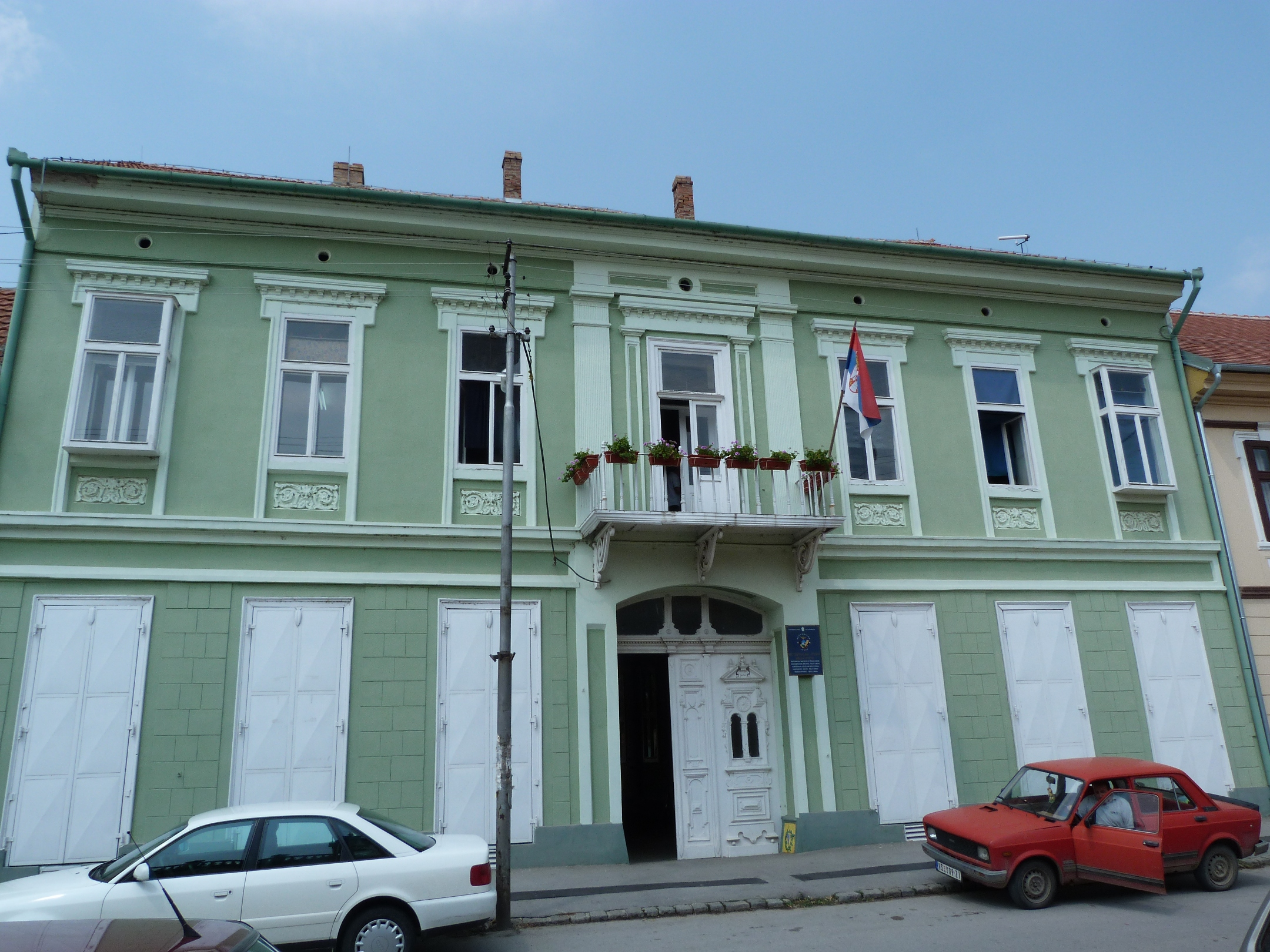
- Building housing the archives

Agency overview
- Formed: 1946; 80 years ago
- Jurisdiction: Government of Serbia
- Headquarters: Bela Crkva, Vojvodina, Serbia; 44°54′12″N 21°25′28″E
- Agency executive: Director, Ljuljana Radonjić
- Parent agency: Archive of Vojvodina
- Website: Official website

Map
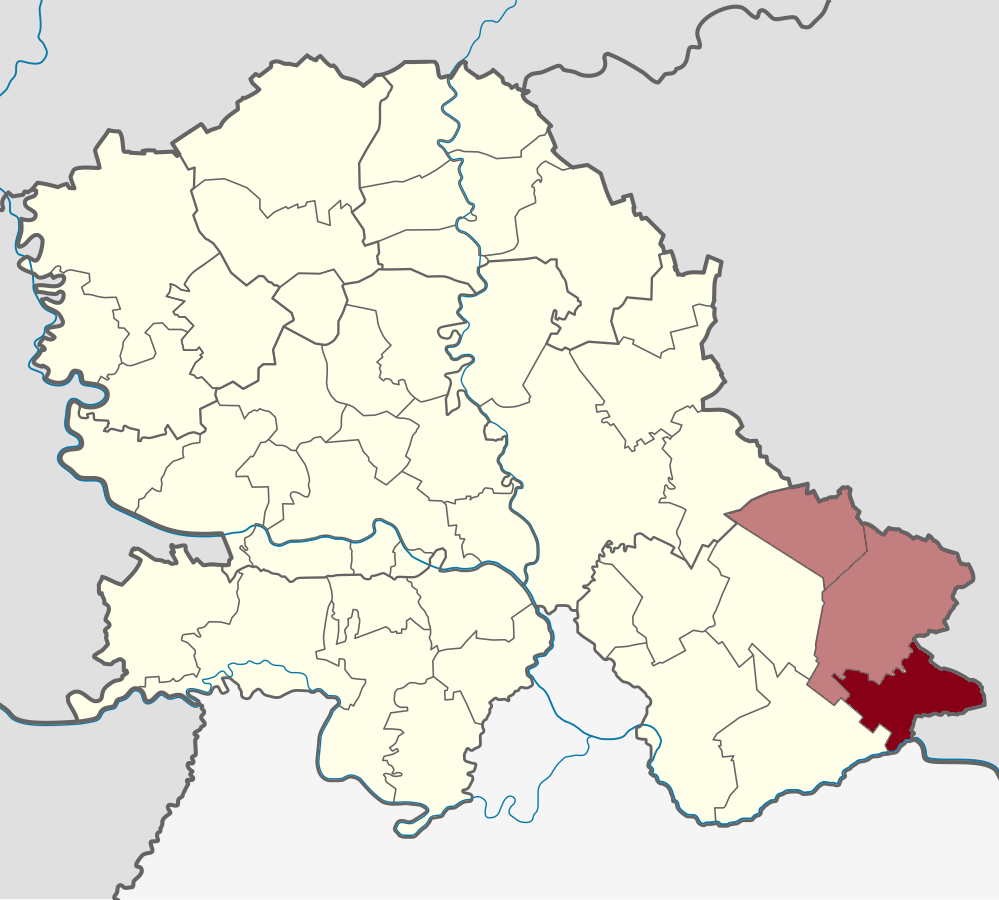
- Area served by the archives shown on the map of Vojvodina, Serbia

The Historical Archives of Bela Crkva (Serbian: Историјски архив Бела Црква, Romanian: Arhiva Istorică a Bela Crkva, Hungarian: Béla Crkva Történeti Levéltára, Czech: Historický archiv Bela Crkva) are the primary institution responsible for preservation of archival materials in the eastern parts of the South Banat District located in Bela Crkva, Vojvodina, Serbia. They are the primary archival institution for the municipalities of Bela Crkva, Vršac, and Plandište while the western and central parts of the district are covered by the Historical Archives of Pančevo.

== See also ==
- List of archives in Serbia
- State Archives of Serbia
- Archives of Vojvodina
