= Pančevo City Library =

Public library in Pančevo, Vojvodina

Coordinates: 44.871936971361734°N 20.64558506011963°E

- Градска библиотека Панчево
- Library in 2020
- Location: Pančevo, Serbia
- Type: Public library
- Established: 11 October 1923 or in 1924

Other information
- Director: Dejan Bosnić
- Website: www.biblioteka-pancevo.org.rs

Pančevo City Library (Serbian: Градска библиотека Панчево, romanized: Gradska biblioteka Pančevo) is a public library in Pančevo, Vojvodina. Opened after World War I in 1923 or 1924, it was originally located in the Magistrate building. The library was moved to a house at the Zmaj Jove Jovanovića 5 street after World War II, before switching back to the Magistrate building in 1965. The library has been situated at the current building since its opening in 1980.

The current director is Dejan Bosnić. The library nowadays organises promotional events, lectures, scientific conferences, and exhibitions, while holding over 200,000 books. It has an organisational unit focused on inclusive services and programmes, such as for disabled people.

== History ==
=== Background and Magistrate ===
The Magistrate, the old seat of the City Library

Librarianship in Pančevo dates back to the 15th century, when a library was opened in the Vojlovica Monastery. The Pančevo City Library was preceded by several libraries in the city, the earliest being Čitaonica (lit. 'Reading Room'), founded in 1810. The bookseller Karl Wittigschlager and the lawyer Svetislav Kasapinović respectively opened a library and a library-like society in 1867. Another library, Srpska Čitaonica (lit. 'Serbian Reading Room') was opened in 1894 and had many magazines and journals in stock.

After World War I, many libraries were re-opened in the city, though a library with a unified catalogue still did not exist. The Serbian Encyclopedia gives the date 11 October 1923 as the library's founding, while the city librarian Goran Trailović says it was founded in 1924. The mayor of Pančevo Vladimir Margan initiated the founding of the city library. He was helped by Nikola Đorđević, a retired professor who collected over 3,000 books for the library. The city senate approved the founding in April 1924, and it was officially founded by the city on 3 July. The library contained many books in German and Hungarian languages. Originally located in the Magistrate building, it merged with the National Museum of Pančevo into a single building, though it operated autonomously.

The library was well-funded and had many visitors, mostly high school students. German-language books were mostly classical literature, the Hungarian-language books were mostly fiction, while the Serbo-Croatian-language books contained patriotic publications. The library was reconstructed in 1936 and re-opened to the public the same year. Before the onset of World War II in Yugoslavia, the library contained around 11,000 publications, had 1,300 members and 12 seats. In 1939, Ljubomir Ristić became the director of the library, but was hanged by the Nazi occupiers on 22 April 1941. During the rest of World War II, from 1941, the library was closed.

=== Post-World War II ===
The library was later seated in the building right to the elementary school

After the war, the commissioners of the communist government visited hundreds of homes, including those of fascists, and collected books and archivable material. Together, they collected over 20,000 books for the new library. According to a 1975 news article, around 108 horse-drawn vehicles were brought to the location of the new library at the Zmaj Jove Jovanovića 5 street, where Srpska Čitaonica was located before the war. The authorities discarded books that were related to fascism, as well as periodicals. They brought furniture from a local school, the People's Bank, and fascist businesses. Under the administration of Mihovil Tomandl (1944–1953), it became a public library. Besides him, Đorđe Živanović and Čeda Malešević were also employed as librarians. Nina Mihajlov, Anica Stojšić, Mirjana Milić, and Tatjana Žukov later joined as associates. The library was ultimately opened to the public in 1946. Most of the well-known books that were present then in the library were in Hungarian and German, not Serbian. A kids section was introduced in 1955.

Considering that the local government offices had moved out of the Magistrate building, the city library was relocated back there in 1965. The current building, at the Nemanjina 1 street, was opened to the public on 27 June 1980. The actors Mira Stupica and Mihailo Janketić, as well as the writers Mika Antić and Pero Zubac were present at the opening; the politician Boško Krunić also gave a speech. The newspaper Pančevac reported that 44 million Yugoslav dinars (350 million Serbian dinars in 2025) were spent on the construction. Since then, the library has regularly organised promotional events, lectures, scientific conferences, and exhibitions. As of the 21st century, the library holds over 200,000 books, 60 archives of magazines, and 18 archives of newspapers. In 2018, the library helped build a street library in the National Garden, and in 2023 it became a member of the Library and Information System of Serbia. As of 2024, the director of the library is Dejan Bosnić and there are 13,000 active members.

== Architecture ==
The current building has 2,380m^{2} of space. There are 110 seats in the building. The preparations for the construction of the current building started in 1976 and the cornerstone was constructed on 29 November 1977. Initially, the building was set to be completed by April 1979, though it was ultimately completed in 1980. Outside the entrance, there is a statue, named Pančevački čitač (lit. 'Pančevo Reader'), unveiled on 7 November 2016.

== Organisation ==
Pančevo City Library has an organisational unit focused on inclusive services and programmes. The library organised a conference regarding improving services for disabled people in 2007, ultimately opening an elevator in the building in 2011. The library also worked on implementing services regarding visually impaired people, by buying a software that would help them read, but were not successful due to lack of technical knowledge of readers. In 2018, the library opened a book club for those with intellectual disabilities. Since 2010, the library has celebrated the International Romani Day.

The library published its first publication in 1936. Since 2002, it has published the Pančevačko čitalište (lit. 'Pančevo Reading Room') periodical, later renamed just to Čitalište.

== Sources ==
- Trailović, Goran (2023). "Izdavačka delatnost Gradske biblioteke Pančevo iz oblasti bibliotekarstva" [Publishing activities of the Pančevo City Library in the field of librarianship]. Bibliotekar (in Serbian). 65 (2): 65–74. doi:10.18485/bibliotekar.2023.65.2.4.
- Trailović, Goran (2024). "Prve pozajmne biblioteke u Pančevu - povodom 100 godina od osnivanja Gradske knjižnice" [The first lending library in Pančevo - on the occasion of the 100th anniversary of the founding of the City Library]. Čitalište: naučni časopis za teoriju i praksu bibliotekarstva (in Serbian). 44: 43–55.
- Trailović, Goran (2025). "Biblioteke za sve - (ne)moguća misija?" [Libraries for all - (impossible) mission?]. Čitalište: naučni časopis za teoriju i praksu bibliotekarstva (in Serbian). 46: 24–30.
