= Uroš Predić Gymnasium, Pančevo =

Uroš Predić Gymnasium Гимназија "Урош Предић" Gimnazija "Uroš Predić"
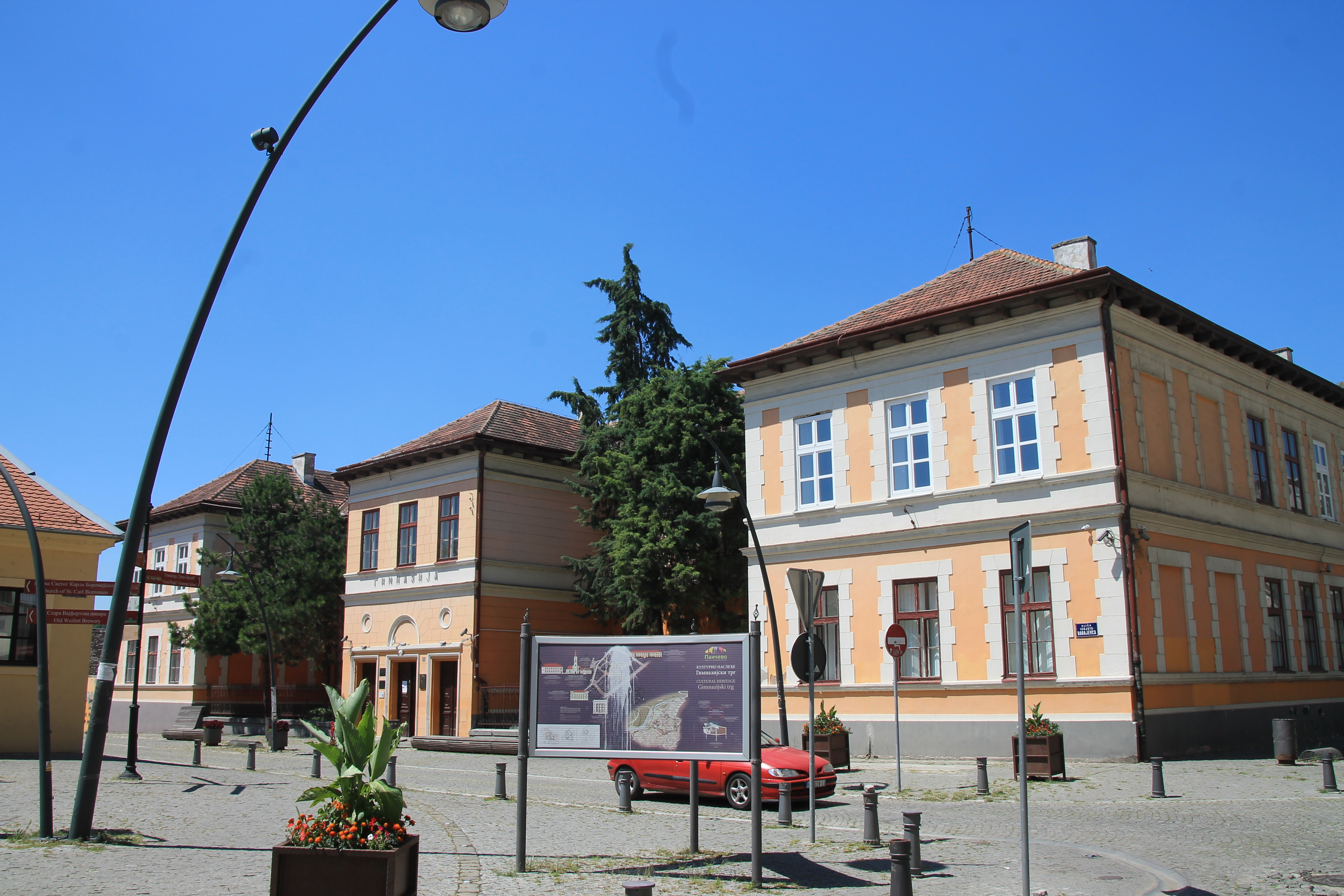
- Gymnasium Building

Location
- Ignjata Barajevca 5, Pančevo; Vojvodina, Serbia
- Coordinates: 44°52′14″N 20°38′16″E

Information
- Other name: Center for Education of Professional Workers in Social Activities (1977–1990)
- School type: Public gymnasium
- Founded: 1863; 162 years ago
- Principal: Zorica Pomar
- Website: gimnazijaurospredic.edu.rs

The Uroš Predić Gymnasium (Serbian Cyrillic: Гимназија "Урош Предић", romanized: Gimnazija "Uroš Predić") is a four-year public high school located in Pančevo, Serbia. It was founded in 1863 and it is one of the oldest educational institutions in Serbia. It is named after Uroš Predić, a realist painter.

== History ==
=== 19th century ===
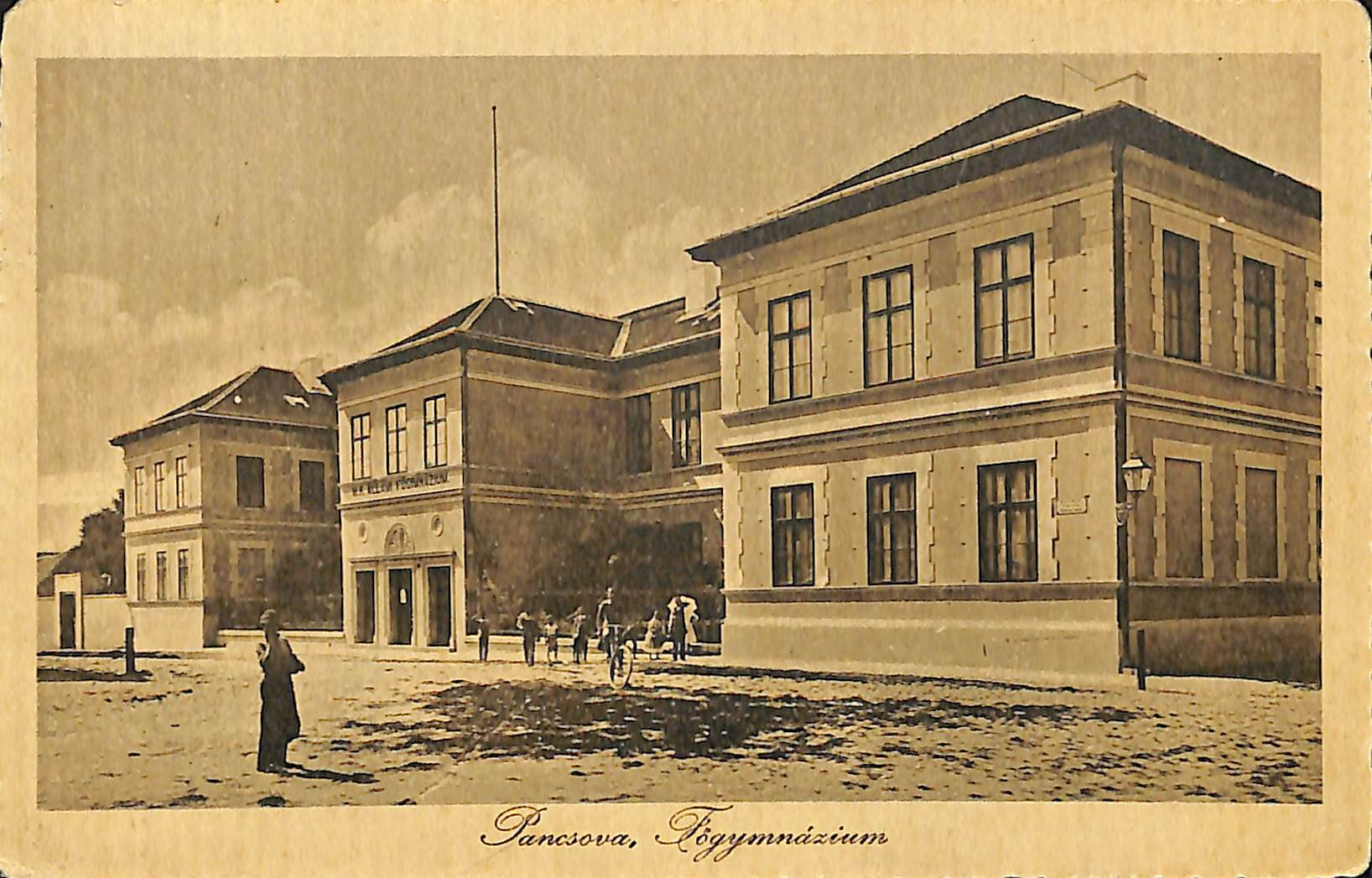
Gymnasium on a postcard

The idea of founding a Serbian gymnasium in Pančevo was initiated by Serbian citizens in the 1830s. Two citizens from Pančevo bequeathed a part of their property for cultural purposes. With the gesture of the barber and grain merchant Tomo Sandulović in 1835, the creation of a fund for the establishment of a gymnasium began. A year later, the grain trader Ignjat Barajevac bequeathed a property that consisted of a large building, the inn "Kod zvezde", for the establishment of a boarding school. But, despite these legacies, the funds were not enough and the authorities were not willing to help financially, so the establishment of the gymnasium was postponed.

By the order of the Court War Council in Vienna in 1851, the Imperial-Royal Lower realschule was opened and in 1863 it was transformed into the Imperial-Royal Higher realschule. At that time, Laza Kostić, a poet, was a student of this German high school during two school years. The location of the school has changed multiple times. It was first located in the house of Karl Weifert, on the corner of Đura Jakšić and Nikola Đurković streets, then in today's Njegoševa Street 8 and then at the site of a military warehouse. Construction of today's building was completed in 1888. The building is one-story in the classicist style, it has the main facade and two protruding side wings. It has a gym in the backyard. The opening ceremony began in the neighbouring Roman Catholic church.

On the left side of the staircase, a granite slab with the inscription "Final cornerstone on 19 November 1888" was walled up, behind which a monument was placed in the cavity. At that time, it was one of the best-equipped schools in Vojvodina and the most prestigious in Austria-Hungary because Viennese professors taught there. At the Paris Exhibition in 1867, students of the gymnasium received praise and an award for their work. The main task of the gymnasium was to provide general education, knowledge of classical languages, and the history of literature to prepare students for university activities. Until the collapse of Austria-Hungary, it was a school for the wealthier strata of society. Mihajlo Pupin, a Serbian physicist and one of the founding members of the National Advisory Committee for Aeronautics (NACA), which later became NASA, was a student of this gymnasium between 1870 and 1872. He had to leave the school in order not to be expelled because of his participation in the torchlight procession as part of Svetozar Miletić's arrival in Pančevo. Painter Uroš Predić finished all seven grades of the gymnasium, from where he went to Vienna to the Academy of Arts in 1876.

=== 20th century ===
During the World War I, the gymnasium was briefly interrupted and turned into a military hospital. After the end of the war, high school students faced many difficulties such as lack of teachers, textbooks, and heating. The school further developed and modernised. Great attention was paid to education and discipline; a ban on children going to the cinema with three poor grades; aprons at least 10 cm below the knee; imprisonment as punishment for certain offences. The school had a choir that won awards, during the term of conductor Jovan Bandur. The string orchestra was also successful, as well as the folklore group. Writer Miloš Crnjanski was a high school teacher in 1921 and 1922. He taught gymnastics and Serbian language, history, and geography classes.

During World War II, the occupation authorities moved the gymnasium out of the building. Classes took place in various rooms in the city while teachers even worked in four shifts. The school property was looted, schools were destroyed, and the library was partially destroyed. After the end of the war and after the instalment of the communist government, plans and programs changed, new subjects were introduced, classes were improved by opening laboratories, enriching the book fund, organising excursions, professional training of professors, founding sectors, and scientific groups. Since 1958, the school has been called Gymnasium "Uroš Predić" but it was changed to the "Center for the Education of Professional Workers in Social Activities" in 1977, but it was renamed back to its former name in 1990. In the gymnasium, there are currently three educational profiles: socio-linguistic, natural-mathematic and informational technologies, computer science and informatics. Besides Pupin, Predić, and Crnjanski, Vasa Živković, Mita Topalović, Stojan Trumić, Dimitrije Stevanović, Dušan Vukajlović, Nebojša Marojević, Stevo Todorčević, Zoran Gajić, Žikica Milosavljević, Nebojša Glogovac, and Nađa Higl were educated in the gymnasium.

== Modern period ==
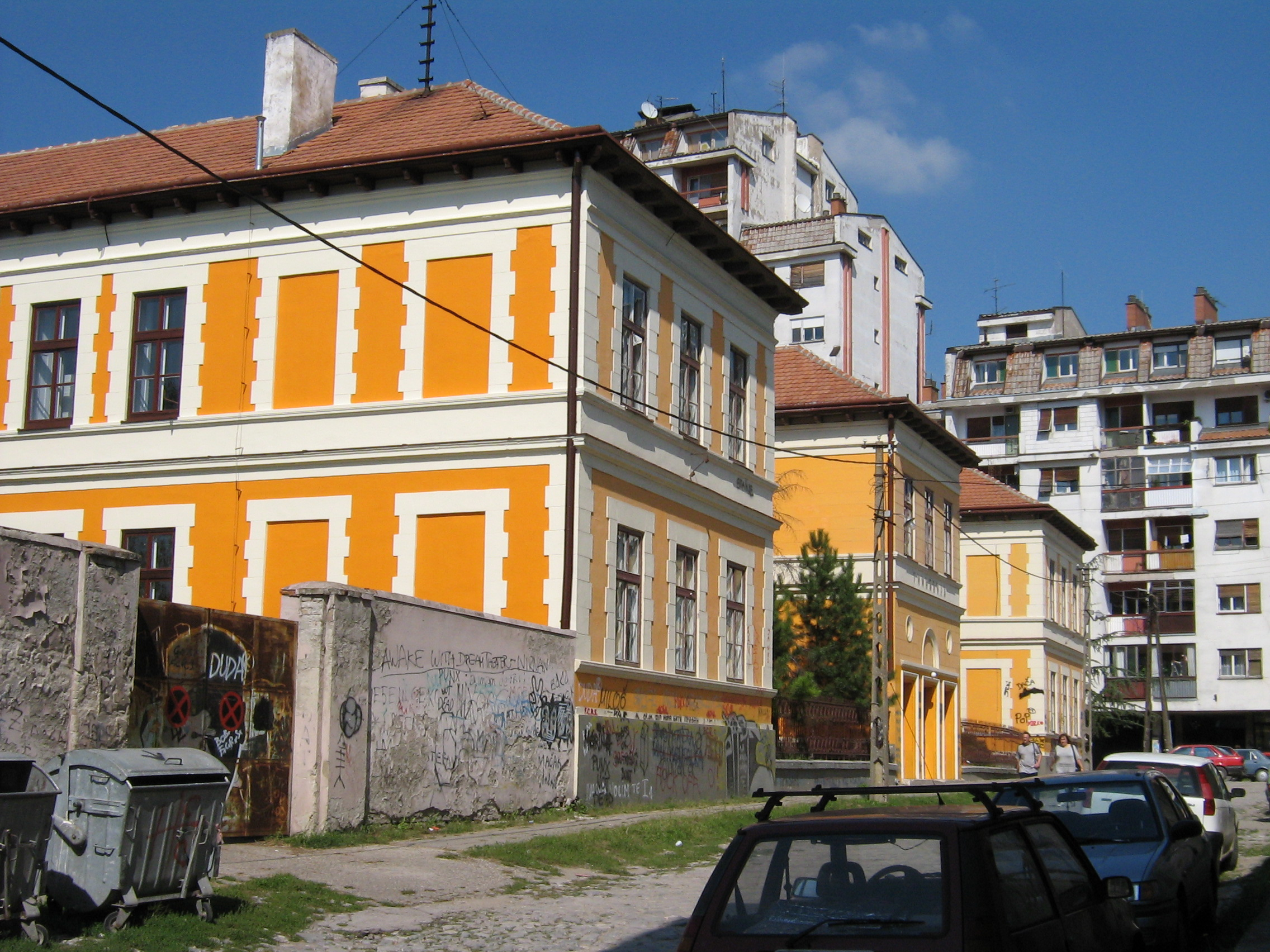
The gymnasium in 2006

In the 21st century, the drama section of the gymnasium has grown into a drama club, while students also operate their magazine called "Chaos" and "Decadent". It cooperates with the Regional Center for Talents "Mihajlo Pupin" and the Research Station in Petnica. Its students participated in the Second Youth Peace Conference in Nuremberg in 2019. In December 2019, the gymnasium hosted a competition called "Gymnasium's idol" in which 17 people participated with more than 400 viewers.
