= Milan Butozan =

Milan Butozan (Serbian Cyrillic: Милан Бутозан; Pančevo, Vojvodina, then part of Austria-Hungary, 28 November 1905 – Zagreb, then part of Independent State of Croatia, 30 March 1943) was a Serbian painter, sculptor, graphic artist, writer, art critic and pedagogue, who was killed by the Ustasha during the Second World War.

== Biography ==
Milan Butozan was born in 1905 in Pančevo where he received his primary and secondary education. His serious artistic education, however, began when he enrolled at the Royal Academy of Arts in Zagreb, in the class of professor Jozo Kljaković, specializing in frescoes, and ended in Belgrade, at the Royal Art School, in 1931.

Butozan's artistic opus includes 2,000 works: numerous portraits, two cycles of frescoes, about 1,000 graphics and at least 15 sculptures, exhibited at numerous solo and group exhibitions in Pančevo, (1933, 1934, 1939) Belgrade (1933), Zagreb (1932, 1934, 1936 and 1940) and abroad. Today, his works are in several museums and private collections throughout the former Yugoslavia, Switzerland and Austria, while his personal legacy, diary and documentation of about 6,000 pages are kept in Zagreb's Archives of Fine Arts of the Croatian Academy of Sciences and Arts. In the meantime, two retrospective exhibitions were held in Pančevo, in 1959 and 2004.

He was shot and killed in Zagreb after a Croatian military interrogation in 1943. Even today, it is not known where he was buried.

== Bibliography ==
- Nacionalna i sveučilišna biblioteka, Hrvatska bibliografija: Knjige 1–2, Biblioteka, Zagreb, (2002)

== Gallery ==
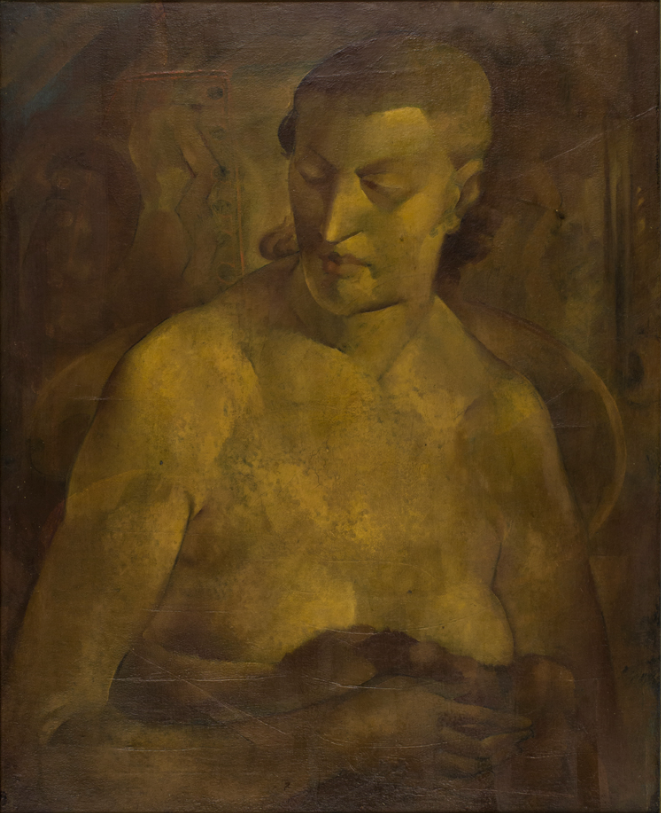
A bust of a woman

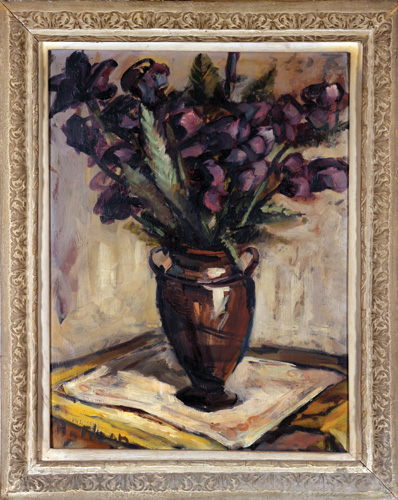
Irises, ~ 1935

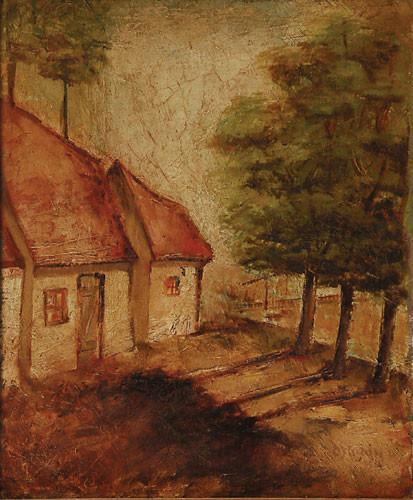
Cottages (1935–37)

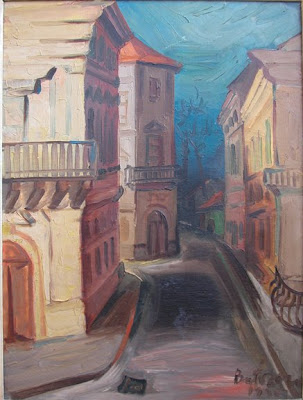
Balconies Zagreb Upper Town. Between 1905 and 1943

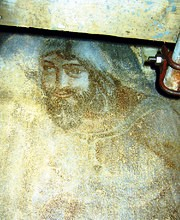
Fresco in the chapel at the Orthodox cemetery in Pancevo. Between 1905 and 1943

== See also ==
- List of Serbian painters
- Stojan Trumić
