= Historical Archives of Pančevo =

- Историјски архив Панчево (Serbian)

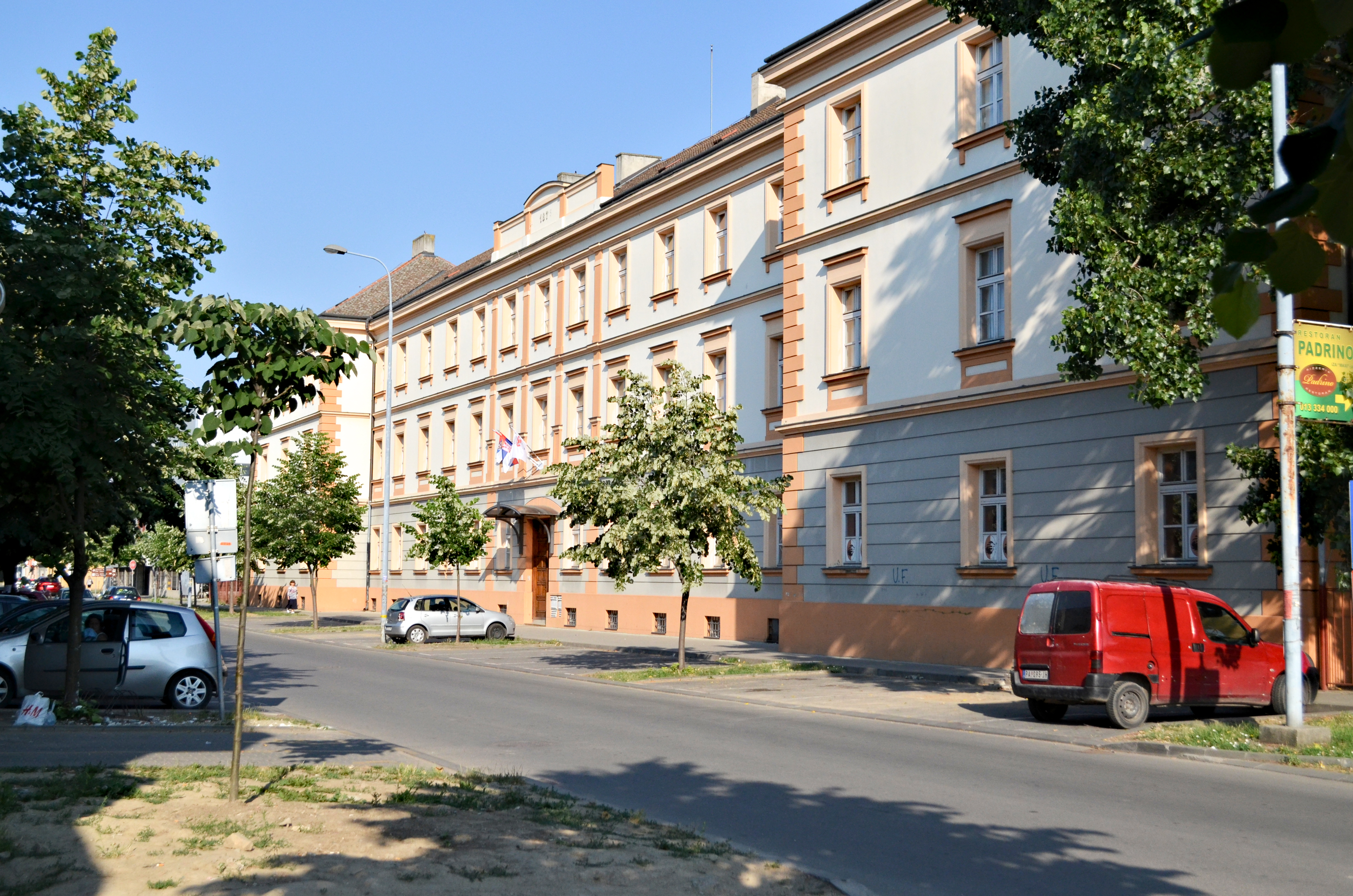
- Building housing the archives

Agency overview
- Formed: 1947
- Jurisdiction: Government of Serbia
- Headquarters: Pančevo, Vojvodina, Serbia
- Parent agency: Archives of Vojvodina
- Website: Official website

Map
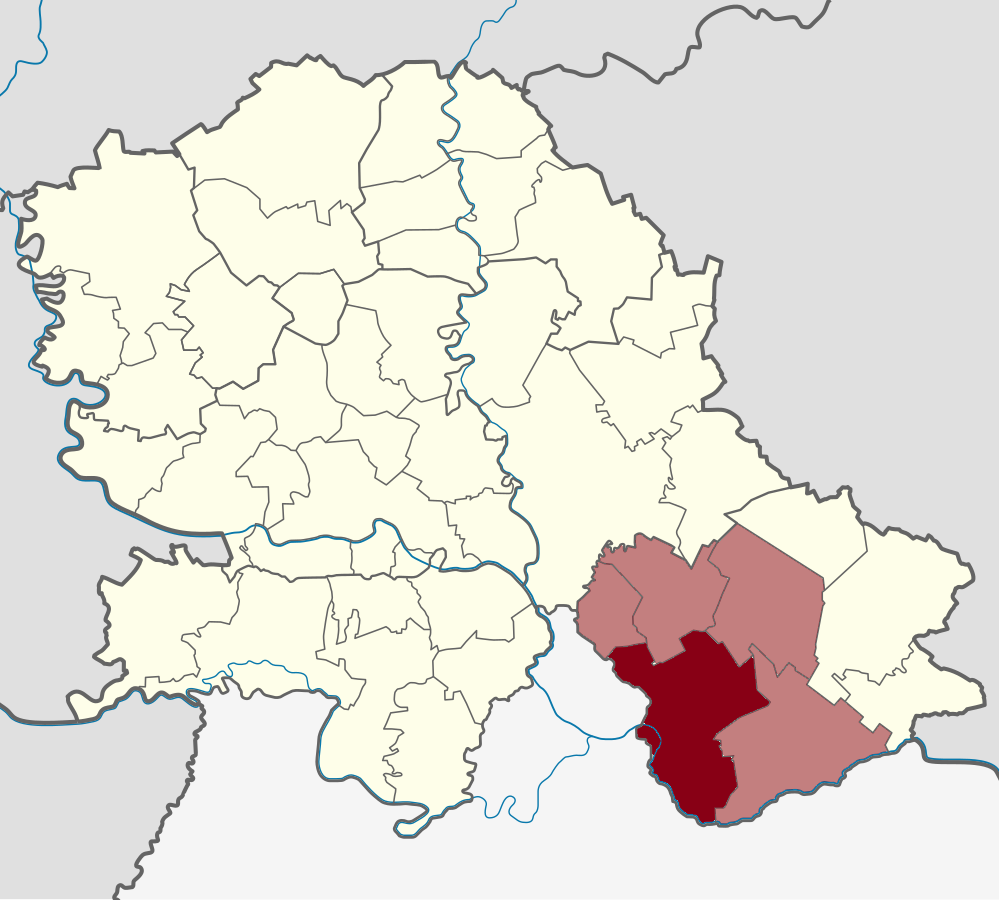
- Area served by the archives shown on the map of Vojvodina, Serbia

The Historical Archives of Pančevo (Serbian: Историјски архив Панчево) are the primary institution responsible for preservation of archival materials in the western and central parts of the South Banat District located in Pančevo, Vojvodina, Serbia. They are the primary archival institution for the municipalities of Pančevo, Kovin, Alibunar, Opovo, and Kovačica. The archive is the largest inter-municipal historical archive in Serbia. The archives house 827 fonds and collections, with a total length of 8,840 meters, covering a period from the early 18th century to the late 20th century.

== See also ==
- List of archives in Serbia
- State Archives of Serbia
- Archives of Vojvodina
- Historical Archives of Bela Crkva
