= Stojan Trumić =

Serbian painter

Stojan Trumić (Titel, 29 July 1912 - Pančevo, 16 October 1983) was a Serbian painter and pedagogue.

== Life and work ==
Stojan Trumić was born on 29 July 1912 in Titel where he attended primary school. He graduated from the high school in Pančevo. From 1934 to 1940 he studied at the Royal Art School in Belgrade. His professors were the painters and professors Beta Vukanović, Jovan Bijelić and Milan Butozan. After graduating, he became one of the members of the group "Ten". He was appointed professor of drawing in Bitola and during the war, he changed his place of residence in Ruma, Panćevo, Petrograd (Zrenjanin), Kikinda, and after the war, he became a professor of drawing at the high school in Pančevo. He founded the art group "Pančevo 5" and was on a study trip to Paris before World War II. He was very innovative as an artist and critical of plagiarism.

After retiring, he continued to paint and contribute to the field of art criticism.

In Stojan Trumić's painting, we distinguish between periods of Intimism, tonal conceptions of painting towards the coloristic organization, expressionism of form and colour towards the coloristic synthesis of form. at the beginning of his career, he was influenced by Milan Konjović and others but later he sought new directions.

He died on 16 October 1983 and was buried in the family tomb in Titel, Vojvodina.

== Acknowledgments ==
- Member of the Academy "Leonardo da Vinci" in Rome,
- Member of the Academy "Europe" in Italy,
- Winner of the Vuk Award
- Recipient of the Order of Merit for the People with silver rays, in his native Titel.
- The National Library and Memorial Gallery in Titel bear his name.

== Group "Ten" ==
The painting group "Desetoro" (Group "Ten") exhibited together in 1940 in Belgrade and Zagreb. The group consisted of Danica Antić, Borivoj Grujić, Nikola Graovac, Dušan Vlajić, Milivoj Nikolajević, Jurica Ribar, Ljubica Sokić, Stojan Trumić, Aleksa Čelebonović and Bogdan Šuput. Although heterogeneous in its composition, the group consisted of two women and eight men, all were academic painters, intellectuals with a university education, but also painters by vocation, they belonged to various social strata from the working class to the bourgeoisie. What this group had in common was that they were all painters and students of Jovan Bijelić. Some of these artists perished in World War II, and those who survived were significant artists in the postwar period.

== See more ==
- List of Serbian painters
- Jovan Bijelić
- Ljubica Sokić

== Literature ==
- М. Arsić, B. Krstić-Blaga, Stojan Trumić, Novi Sad 1987.
- Trifunović, Lazar (1973), "Serbian painting 1900 - 1950" - Synthesis Library (in: (language: Serbian)). YU-Belgrade: Nolit. p. 533
- Protić, Miodrag B., "Serbian painting of the XX century", Volume 1. - Library of Synthesis. YU-Belgrade: Nolit, (1970).
- Živković, Stanislav, "Umetnička škola u Beogradu 1919—1939", SANU, Beograd (1987)
- Čelebonović A., "Contemporary Painting in Yugoslavia", Yugoslavia, Belgrade, (1965)
