= Historical Archives of Smederevo =

- Историјски архив у Смедереву (Serbian)

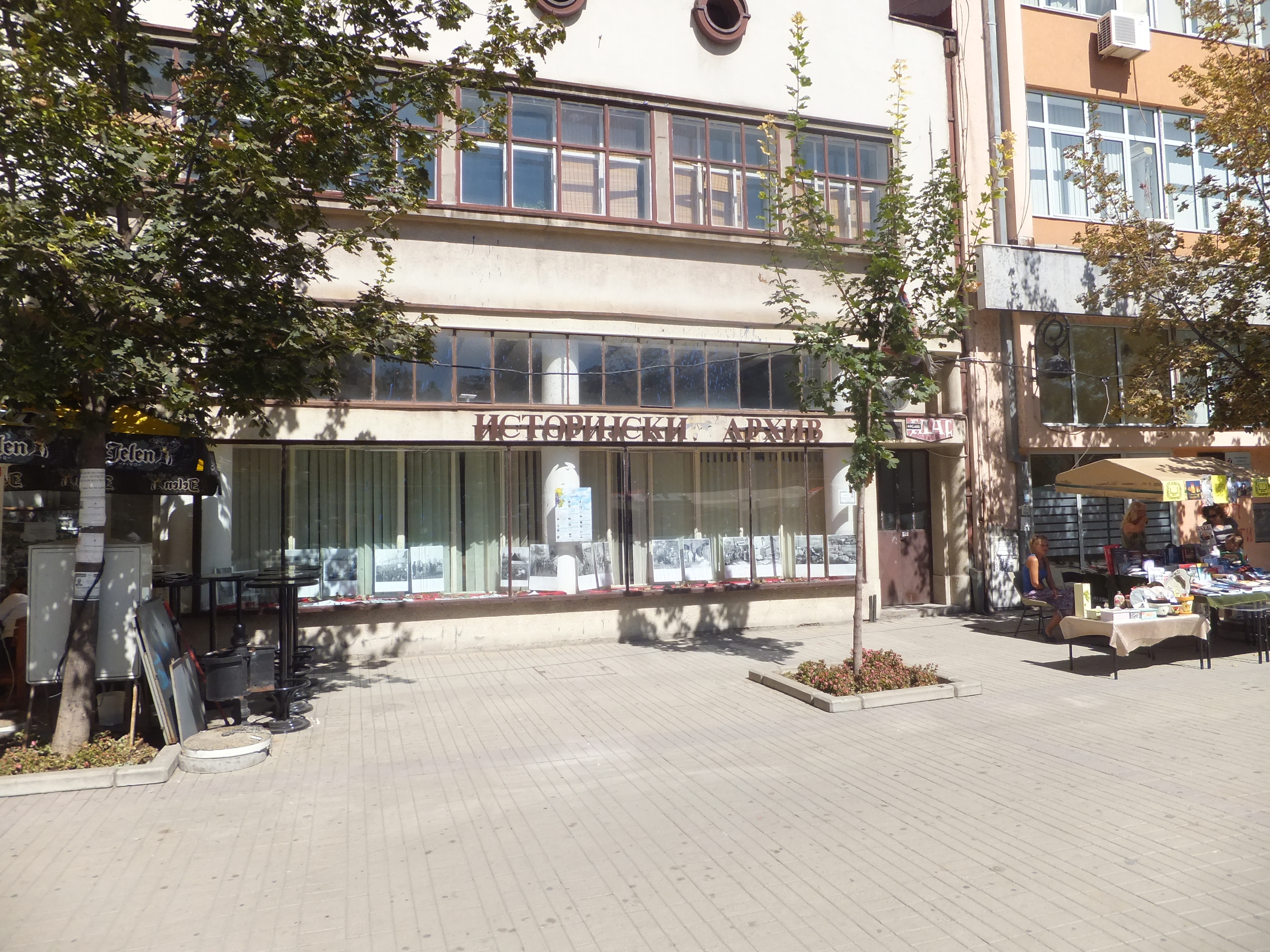

Agency overview
- Formed: 1992; 34 years ago
- Jurisdiction: Government of Serbia
- Headquarters: Kralja Petra Prvog 2, 26000 Smederevo, Serbia
- Parent agency: State Archives of Serbia
- Website: Official website

Map
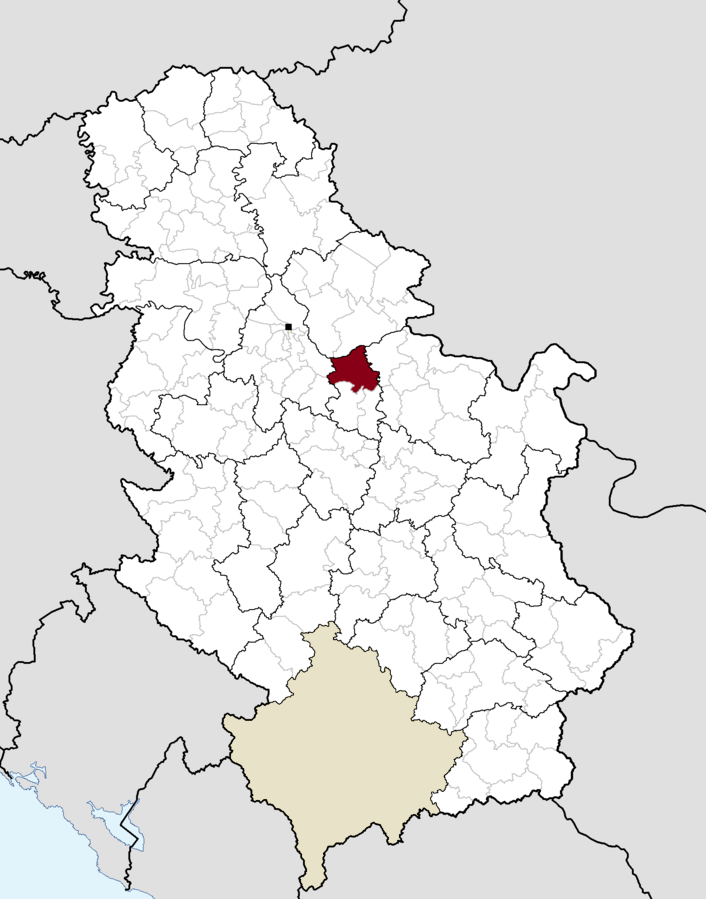
- Area served by the archive shown on the map of Serbia

The Historical Archives of Smederevo (Serbian: Историјски архив у Смедереву) are the primary institution responsible for preservation of archival materials in north of the Podunavlje District (the rest of the district covered by the Archive in Smederevska Palanka) located in Smederevo, Serbia. While holding the formal status of regional archive, the institution is serving the municipality of Smederevo exclusively, being the only regional archives in the country serving a sole municipality. The archives were formally established in 1992 and effectively started their work in 1994.

== See also ==
- List of archives in Serbia
- State Archives of Serbia
