= Syracuse University =

Private university in Syracuse, New York, US

- Motto: Suos Cultores Scientia Coronat (Latin)
- Motto in English: "Knowledge crowns those who seek her"
- Type: Private research university
- Established: March 24, 1870; 156 years ago
- Accreditation: MSCHE
- Religious affiliation: Nonsectarian; historically affiliated with the United Methodist Church
- Academic affiliations: CUMU; IAMSCU; NAICU; ORAU; URA; Space-grant
- Endowment: $2.27 billion (2025)
- Budget: $1.9 billion (2025)
- Chancellor: Mike Haynie
- Provost: Lois Agnew
- Faculty: 2,100+
- Administrative staff: 5,300+
- Students: 22,589 (2024)
- Undergraduates: 15,957 (2024)
- Postgraduates: 6,632 (2024)
- Location: Syracuse, New York, United States; 43.0376°N 76.1340°W
- Campus: 969 acres (392.1 ha); Midsize city
- Newspaper: The Daily Orange
- Colors: Orange
- Nickname: Orange
- Sporting affiliations: NCAA Division I FBS – ACC; AHA; EARC; IRA; PEC
- Mascot: Otto the Orange
- Website: syracuse.edu

Syracuse University (informally 'Cuse or SU) is a private research university in Syracuse, New York, United States. It was established in 1870 with roots in the Methodist Episcopal Church but has been nonsectarian since 1920. Located in the city's University Hill neighborhood, east and southeast of downtown Syracuse, the large campus features an eclectic mix of architecture, ranging from nineteenth-century Romanesque Revival to contemporary buildings. Syracuse University is organized into 13 schools and colleges and in the Carnegie Classification of Institutions of Higher Education is classified as "R1: Doctoral Universities – Very high research activity".

Syracuse University athletic teams, the Orange, participate in 20 intercollegiate sports. SU is a member of the Atlantic Coast Conference (ACC) for all NCAA Division I athletics, except for the men's rowing and women's ice hockey teams. SU is also a member of the Eastern College Athletic Conference. Alumni, faculty, and affiliates include former president Joe Biden, 36 Olympic Medalists, Academy Award winners, Emmy Award winners, Grammy Award winners, governors, and members of the U.S. Senate and House of Representatives.

== History ==
=== Founding ===
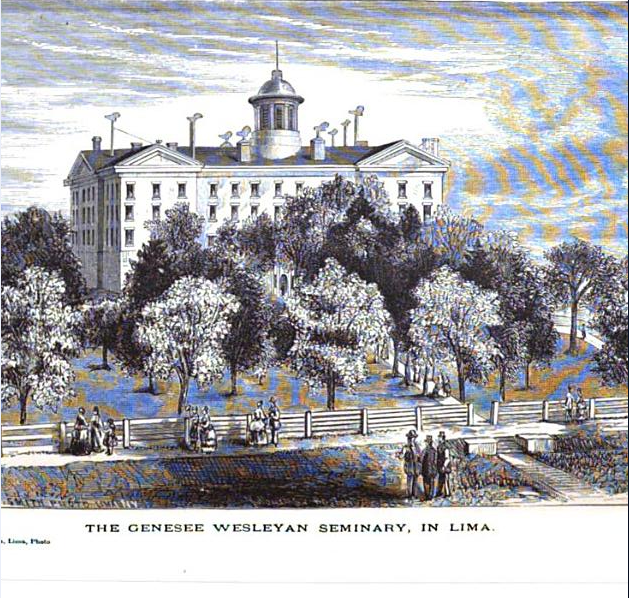
Genesee Wesleyan Seminary

The institution's roots can be traced to the Genesee Wesleyan Seminary. The seminary was founded in 1831 by the Genesee annual conference of the Methodist Episcopal Church in Lima, New York, south of Rochester. In 1850, it was resolved to enlarge the institution from a seminary into a college, or to connect a college with the seminary, becoming Genesee College. However, the location was soon thought by many to be insufficiently central. Its difficulties were compounded by a new railroad that competed with the Erie Canal and reconfigured the region's primary economic conduits to bypass Lima. The trustees of the struggling college decided to seek an alternate locale whose economic and transportation advantages could provide a surer base of support.

The college began looking for a new home at the same time that Syracuse, ninety miles to the east, was searching to bring a university to the city after having failed to convince Ezra Cornell and Andrew Dickson White to locate Cornell University in Syracuse rather than in Ithaca. Syracuse resident White pressed that the new university should relocate on the hill in Syracuse (the current location of Syracuse University) due to the city's attractive transportation hub, which would ease the recruitment of faculty, students, and other persons of note. However, as a young carpenter working in Syracuse, Cornell had been cheated of his wages by an employer there. Instead, he insisted Cornell University be in Ithaca on his large farm on East Hill, overlooking the town and Cayuga Lake.

Meanwhile, there were several years of dispute between the Methodist ministers, Lima, and contending cities across the state over proposals to move Genesee College to Syracuse. At the time, the ministers wanted a share of the funds from the Morrill Land Grant Act for Genesee College. They agreed to a quid pro quo donation of $25,000 from Senator Cornell in exchange for their (and their Methodist constituents') support for his bill. Cornell insisted the bargain be written into the bill and Cornell became New York State's Land Grant University in 1865. In 1869, Genesee College obtained New York State approval to move to Syracuse but Lima got a court injunction to block the move, and thus Genesee stayed in Lima until it was dissolved in 1875. By that time, however, the court injunction had been made moot by the founding of a new university on March 24, 1870. On that date the State of New York granted the new Syracuse University its own charter independent of Genesee College. The Methodist church subscribed an endowment of $400,000 and the City of Syracuse offered $100,000 to establish the school. Methodist bishop Jesse T. Peck had donated $25,000 to the proposed school and was elected the first president of the board of trustees.

Methodist pastor Daniel Steele, a former Genesee College president, served as the first administrative leader of Syracuse until its Chancellor was appointed. The university opened in September 1871 in rented space downtown. Judge George F. Comstock, a member of the new university's board of trustees, had offered the school 50 acres (200,000 m^{2}) of farmland on a hillside to the southeast of the city center. Comstock intended Syracuse University and the hill to develop as an integrated whole; a contemporary account described the latter as "a beautiful town ... springing up on the hillside and a community of refined and cultivated membership ... established near the spot which will soon be the center of a great and beneficent educational institution."

The university was founded as coeducational and racially integrated: "open to men and women, white and black." President Peck stated at the opening ceremonies, "The conditions of admission shall be equal to all persons... there shall be no invidious discrimination here against woman.... brains and heart shall have a fair chance... " Syracuse implemented this policy with a high proportion of women students for its era. In the College of Liberal Arts, the ratio between male and female students during the 19th century was approximately even. The College of Fine Arts was predominantly female, while lower ratios of women enrolled in the College of Medicine and the College of Law. Men and women were taught together in the same courses, and many extra-curricular activities were coeducational as well. Syracuse also developed "women-only" organizations and clubs.

=== Expansion ===
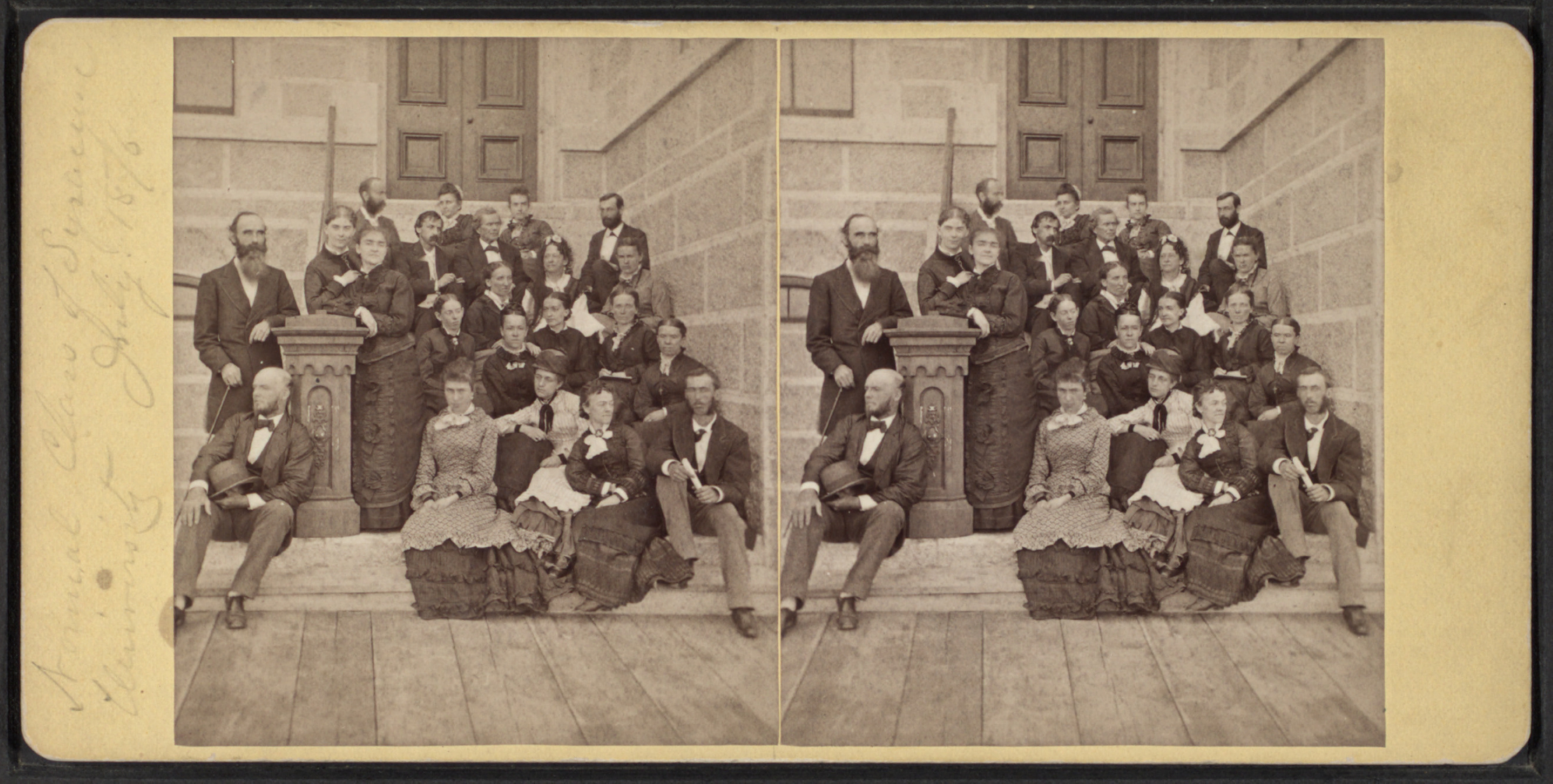
First Annual Class of Syracuse University in July 1876

Coeducation at Syracuse traced its roots to the early days of Genesee College where educators and students like Frances Willard and Belva Lockwood were heavily influenced by the Women's movement in nearby Seneca Falls, New York. However, the progressive "co-ed" policies practiced at Genesee would soon find controversy at the new university in Syracuse. Colleges and universities admitted few women students in the 1870s. Administrators and faculty argued women had inferior minds and could not master mathematics and the classics. Erastus Otis Haven, Syracuse University chancellor and former president of the University of Michigan and Northwestern University, maintained that women should receive the advantages of higher education. He enrolled his daughter Frances at Syracuse, where she joined the other newly admitted female students in founding the Gamma Phi Beta sorority. The inclusion of women in the early days of the university led to the proliferation of various women's clubs and societies. Frank Smalley, a Syracuse professor coined the term "sorority" specifically for Gamma Phi Beta.

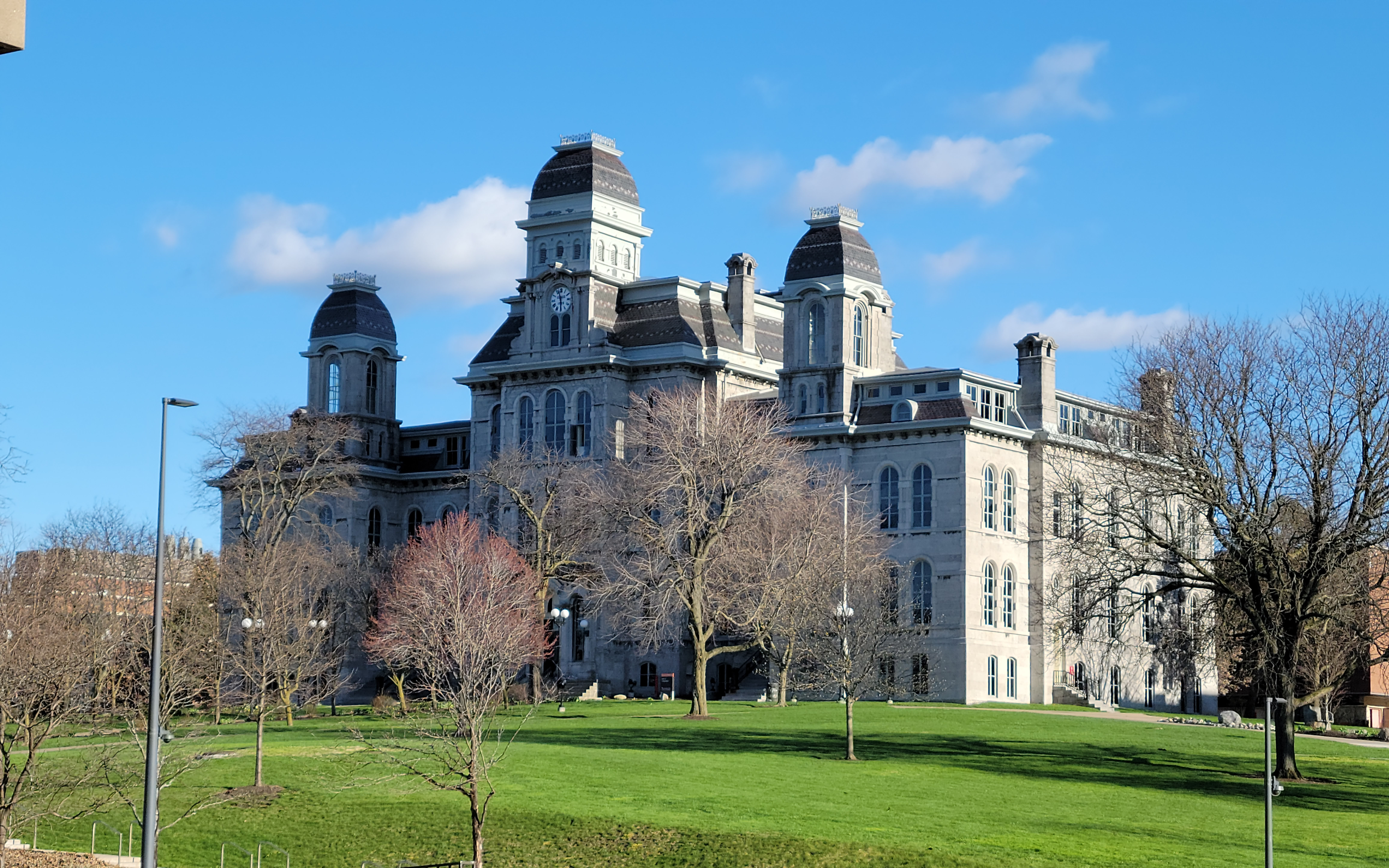
The Hall of Languages was the first building on the Syracuse University campus, opening in 1873.

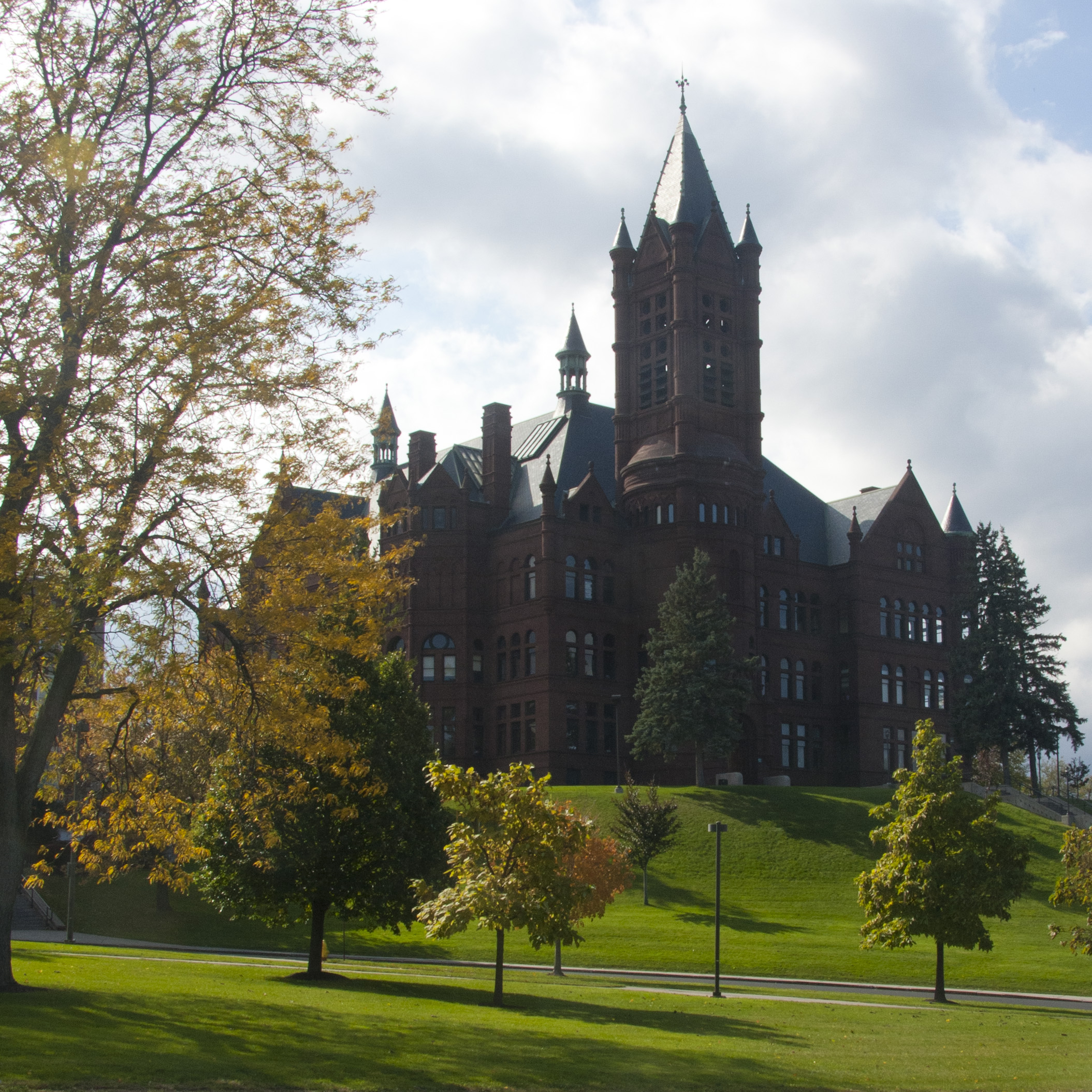
Crouse College, a Romanesque building completed in 1889, housed the first College of Fine Arts in the U.S. It is now the home of the Setnor School of Music.

In the late 1880s, the university engaged in a rapid building spree. Holden Observatory (1887) was followed by two Romanesque Revival buildings – Von Ranke Library (1889), now Tolley Humanities Building, and Crouse College (1889). Together with the Hall of Languages, these first buildings formed the basis for the "Old Row," a grouping which, along with its companion Lawn, established one of Syracuse's most enduring images. The emphatically linear organization of these buildings along the brow of the hill follows a tradition of American campus planning which dates to the construction of the "Yale Row" in the 1790s. At Syracuse, "The Old Row" continued to provide the framework for growth well into the twentieth century.

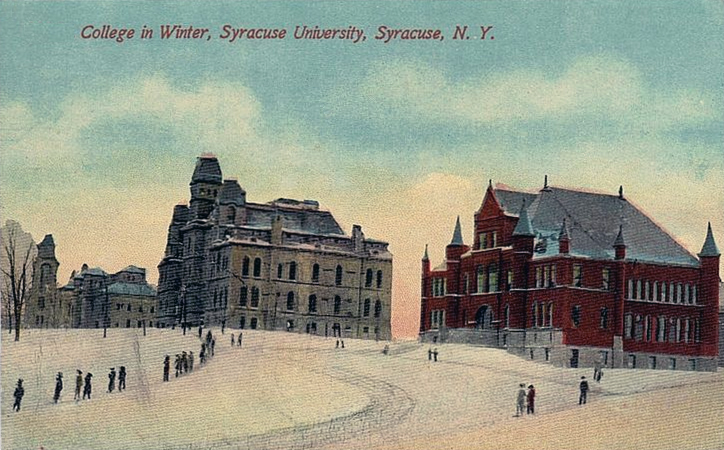
Left to right: Hall of Languages and Von Ranke Library

From its founding until the early 1920s, the university grew rapidly. It offered programs in the physical sciences and modern languages and, in 1873, added one of the first architecture programs in the U.S. It was also the first institution to grant a Bachelor of Fine Arts (BFA) degree in the United States. In 1874, Syracuse created the nation's first bachelor of fine arts degree. In 1876, the school offered its first post-graduate courses in the College of Arts and Sciences. SU created its first doctoral program in 1911. In 1919, Syracuse added its business school which contains multiple MBA programs. SU's school of journalism, now the S.I. Newhouse School of Public Communications, was established at Syracuse in 1934.

The growth of Syracuse University from a small liberal arts college into a major comprehensive university was due to the efforts of two men, chancellor James Roscoe Day and John Dustin Archbold. James Roscoe Day served the Calvary Church in New York City where he befriended Archbold. Together, the two dynamic figures oversaw the first of two great periods of campus renewal in Syracuse's history.

John Dustin Archbold was a capitalist, philanthropist, and President of the board of trustees at Syracuse University. He was known as John D. Rockefeller's right-hand man and successor at the Standard Oil Company. He was a close friend of Syracuse University Chancellor James R. Day and gave almost $6 million to the university over his lifetime. Said a journalist in 1917:

Mr. Archbold's ... is the president of the board of trustees of Syracuse University, an institution which has prospered so remarkably since his connection with it that its student roll has increased from hundreds to over 4,000, including 1,500 young women, placing it in the ranks of the foremost institutions of learning in the United States.

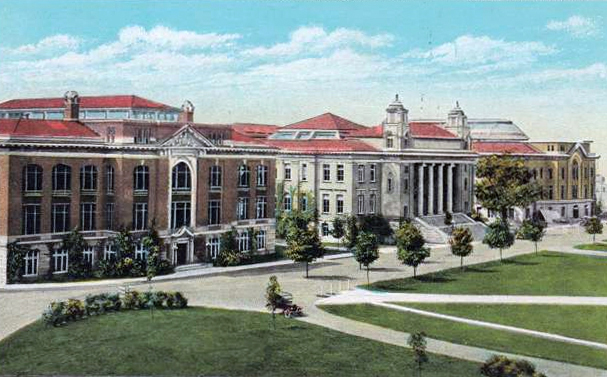
From left to right: Bowne Hall, Carnegie Library, Archbold Gymnasium

In 1905, James D. Phelps secured a donation of $150,000 from Andrew Carnegie for a new university library provided the university raised an equal sum as an endowment for the library. The university raised the required endowment in a little over a month, with the largest share being contributed by Archbold. On September 11, 1907, the transfer of the Von Ranke collection from the old library building marking the opening of the new Carnegie library with a collection of over 71,000 volumes.

In addition to keeping the university financially solvent during its early years, Archbold also contributed funds for eight buildings, including the full cost of Archbold Stadium (opened 1907, demolished 1978), Sims Hall (men's dormitory, 1907), the Archbold Gymnasium (1909, nearly destroyed by fire in 1947, but still in use), and the oval athletic field.

=== Modern ===
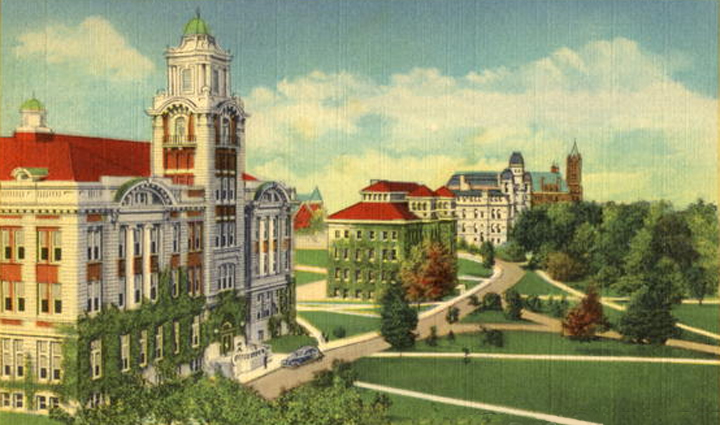
The Old Row, campus of Syracuse University, 1920

After World War II, Syracuse University transformed into a major research institution. Enrollment increased in the four years after the war due to the G.I. Bill, which paid tuition, room, board, and a small allowance for veterans returning from World War II. In 1946, the university admitted 9,464 freshmen, nearly four times greater than the previous incoming class. Branch campuses were established in Endicott, New York, and Utica, New York, which became Binghamton University and Utica University respectively.

By the end of the 1950s, Syracuse ranked twelfth nationally in terms of the amount of its sponsored research and it had over four hundred professors and graduate students engaging in that investigation. From the early 1950s through the 1960s, Syracuse University added programs and staff that continued the transformation of the school into a research university. In 1954, Arthur Phillips was recruited from MIT and started the first pathogen-free animal research laboratory. The lab focused on studying medical problems using animal models. The School of Social Work, which eventually merged into the College of Human Ecology, was founded in 1956. Syracuse's College of Engineering also founded the nation's second-oldest computer engineering and bioengineering programs. In 1962, Samuel Irving Newhouse Sr. donated $15 million to begin construction of a school of communications, eventually known as the S.I. Newhouse School of Public Communications. In 1966, Syracuse University was admitted to the Association of American Universities.

In 1987, allegations of discrimination against Jewish women received media attention.

=== 1988 crash of Pan Am Flight 103 ===
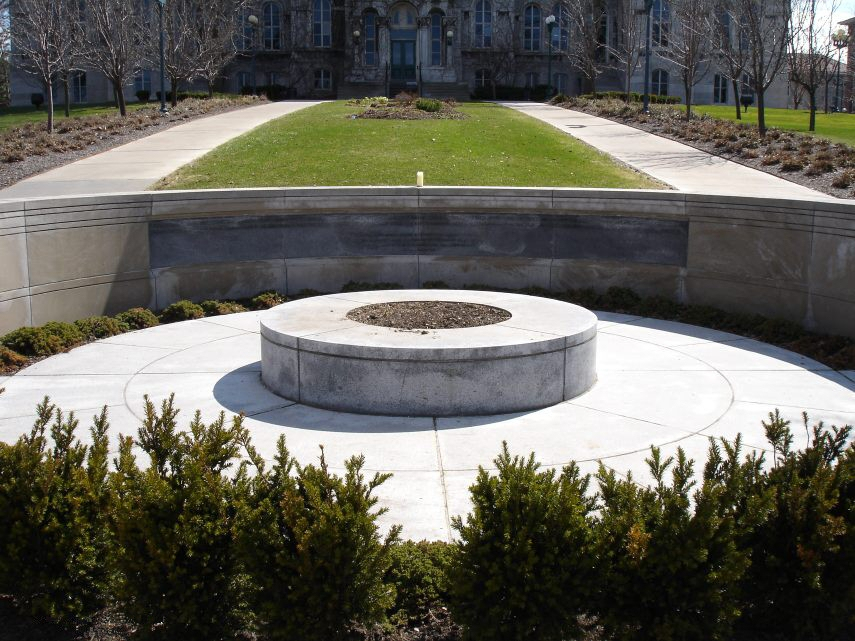
SU's Flight 103 Memorial

On December 21, 1988, 35 Syracuse University students were killed in the terrorist bombing of Pan Am Flight 103 over Lockerbie, Scotland. The students were returning from a study-abroad program in Europe. That evening, Syracuse University went on with a basketball game just hours after the attack, for which the university was severely criticized and the university's chancellor subsequently apologized. The bombing of Flight 103 was the deadliest terrorist attack against the United States prior to the attacks on September 11, 2001.

In April 1990, Syracuse University dedicated a memorial wall to the students killed on Flight 103, constructed at the entrance to the main campus in front of the Hall of Languages. Every year the university holds "Remembrance Week" during the fall semester to commemorate the students. The university also maintains a link to the tragedy with the "Remembrance Scholars" program, when 35 senior students receive scholarships during their final year at the university. The "Lockerbie Scholars" program previously coincided with this, where two graduating students from Lockerbie Academy study at Syracuse for one year. The Lockerbie Scholars program underwent several reiterations throughout 2023-2026. It is now the "Lockerbie Fellowship", where 10 high school seniors from Lockerbie Academy travel to Syracuse for just remembrance week for an immersive experience.

=== 21st century ===
In 2018, the university's Theta Tau fraternity was expelled after a video showing a mock initiation ritual featuring racist, antisemitic, ableist, and homophobic language.

In 2019, over ten instances of racist graffiti, swastikas, and other bigoted language were found around campus. That same week, the university suspended the Alpha Chi Rho fraternity after the university determined that four of its members yelled a racial epithet at a black student on campus. All social activities at fraternities were suspended for the rest of the semester as a result of these racist and antisemitic incidents, but officials of the university were criticized for not doing enough.

Days later, a white supremacist manifesto was allegedly sent to several students studying in the library using Apple's AirDrop service and was also posted on a website about Greek Life at Syracuse University—the same manifesto that had been cited prior to the Christchurch mosque shootings. However, the Syracuse Police Department and the university's Department of Public Safety could not find anyone who directly received the manifesto to verify these claims. In response, Syracuse University denied that there was any "credible threat", and the chancellor said that the alleged circulation of the manifesto "was probably a hoax" in an address to the University Senate.

#NotAgainSU is a student-led organization that began after racist incidents at Syracuse University in 2019. In response, students organized a sit-in where they occupied, and presented a list of 19 demands for Chancellor Kent Syverud to sign. After several protests, some taking place at his personal residence, the list was signed with revisions on November 21.

As of 2020, the university had supported faculty member Douglas Biklen and his discredited pseudoscientific practice of facilitated communication for nearly 30 years. The university's Institute on Communication and Inclusion (formerly called the "Facilitated Communication Institute"), founded by Bilken, has offered workshops with the intent of "giving a voice and a means to communicate to people with disabilities". However, in a 2016 article, the editorial board of the independent student newspaper The Daily Orange, condemned the university's support for this practice. "It is inexcusable and equal-parts embarrassing for Syracuse University as a research institution to stand behind facilitated communication (FC) despite it being a potentially life-destroying practice that has been empirically debunked."

In late April 2024, student organizers established the Gaza Solidarity Encampment (GSE) on the Shaw Quadrangle, part of a wave of similar demonstrations at nearly 200 college campuses across the United States, calling on the university to support a ceasefire in Gaza and divest from weapons manufacturers. The encampment peaked at approximately 70 tents. Ahead of Commencement weekend, the university directed protesters to relocate. Organizers refused and the encampment ended voluntarily on May 15, after roughly two weeks, following stalled negotiations. The university also issued the "Syracuse Statement on Free Expression and Free Inquiry" on May 7, becoming one of the first universities alongside Harvard University to adopt a policy of institutional neutrality on controversial political issues. The university then initiated student conduct proceedings against approximately seven students for failing to comply with the relocation directive, a decision faculty members and advocacy groups criticized as a threat to academic freedom. In October 2025, Syverud stated at a panel hosted by the advocacy group Alums for Campus Fairness that the demonstrations had been "encouraged from Iran" and lacked significant Syracuse student involvement; a university spokesperson clarified that Syverud meant the encampment represented only a small share of the university's total enrollment.

In July 2025, Syverud announced that the university had closed its Office of Diversity and Inclusion, replacing it with an "Office of People and Culture" housed within Human Resources. The closure followed federal policies implemented by the Trump administration threatening universities with loss of federal funding for maintaining diversity programs. Syracuse University was among over 130 institutions identified by the administration for potential investigations related to diversity, equity, and inclusion programs. The executive order specifically targeted universities with endowments exceeding $1 billion, with the university's endowment valued at over $2 billion as of 2024.

In late August 2025, Syverud announced he would step down as president and chancellor in June 2026, concluding a twelve-year tenure that began in 2014. Syverud cited personal and professional reflection as the basis for his decision, with his departure also coinciding with the expiration of his contract. On March 3, 2026, J. Michael (Mike) Haynie was appointed 13th Chancellor and President of Syracuse University and planned to assume the role on July 1, 2026. On April 15, 2026, during his final weeks as chancellor, Syverud announced that he had been diagnosed with a form of brain cancer, and would step down from the role early and would be replaced by Haynie.

In June 2026, Haynie announced that Syracuse University expected to fall short of its undergraduate enrollment target for fall 2026, resulting in a projected budget deficit. Haynie attributed the shortfall in part to broader demographic and enrollment challenges affecting higher education institutions nationwide.

== Campuses ==
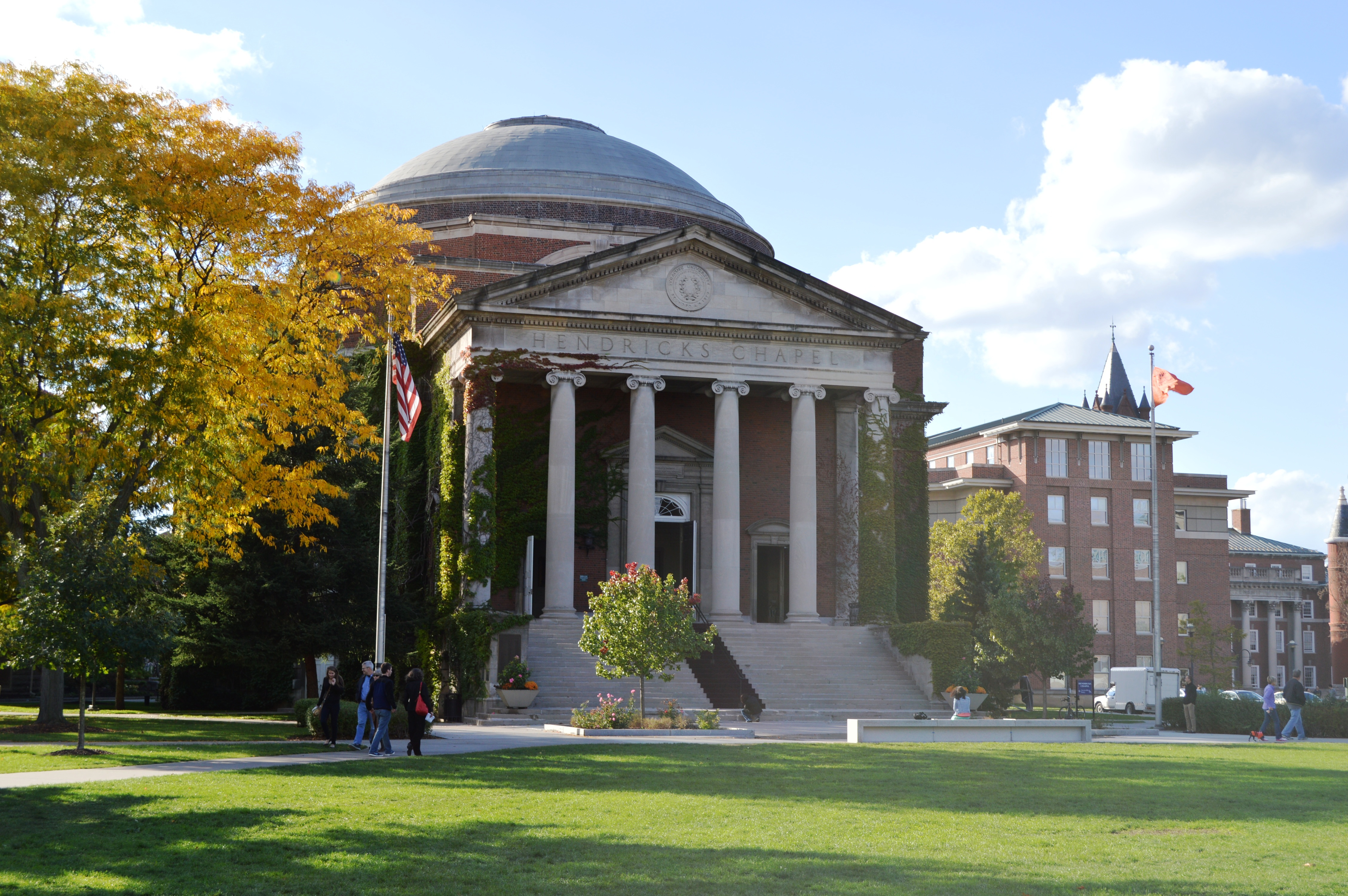
Hendricks Chapel

The university is set on a campus that features an eclectic mix of buildings, ranging from nineteenth-century Romanesque Revival structures to contemporary buildings designed by renowned architects such as I.M. Pei. The center of campus, with its grass quadrangle, landscaped walkways, and outdoor sculptures, offers students the amenities of a traditional college experience. The university overlooks downtown Syracuse, a medium-sized city of approximately 150,000 residents in Central New York.

The school also owns an on-campus Sheraton Hotel; (later turned into a dorm named Riley Hall), Marshall Square Mall; the Drumlins Country Club, a nearby, 36-hole golf course to the east of South Campus; the Marshall, a 287-bed student housing complex (later renamed Milton Hall); the Fisher Center and Joseph I. Lubin House in New York City; the Paul Greenberg House in Washington, D.C.; the Minnowbrook Conference Center, a 28-acre (121,000 m^{2}) retreat in the Adirondack Mountains of Upstate New York; and various properties surrounding its University Hill campus.

=== Main campus ===
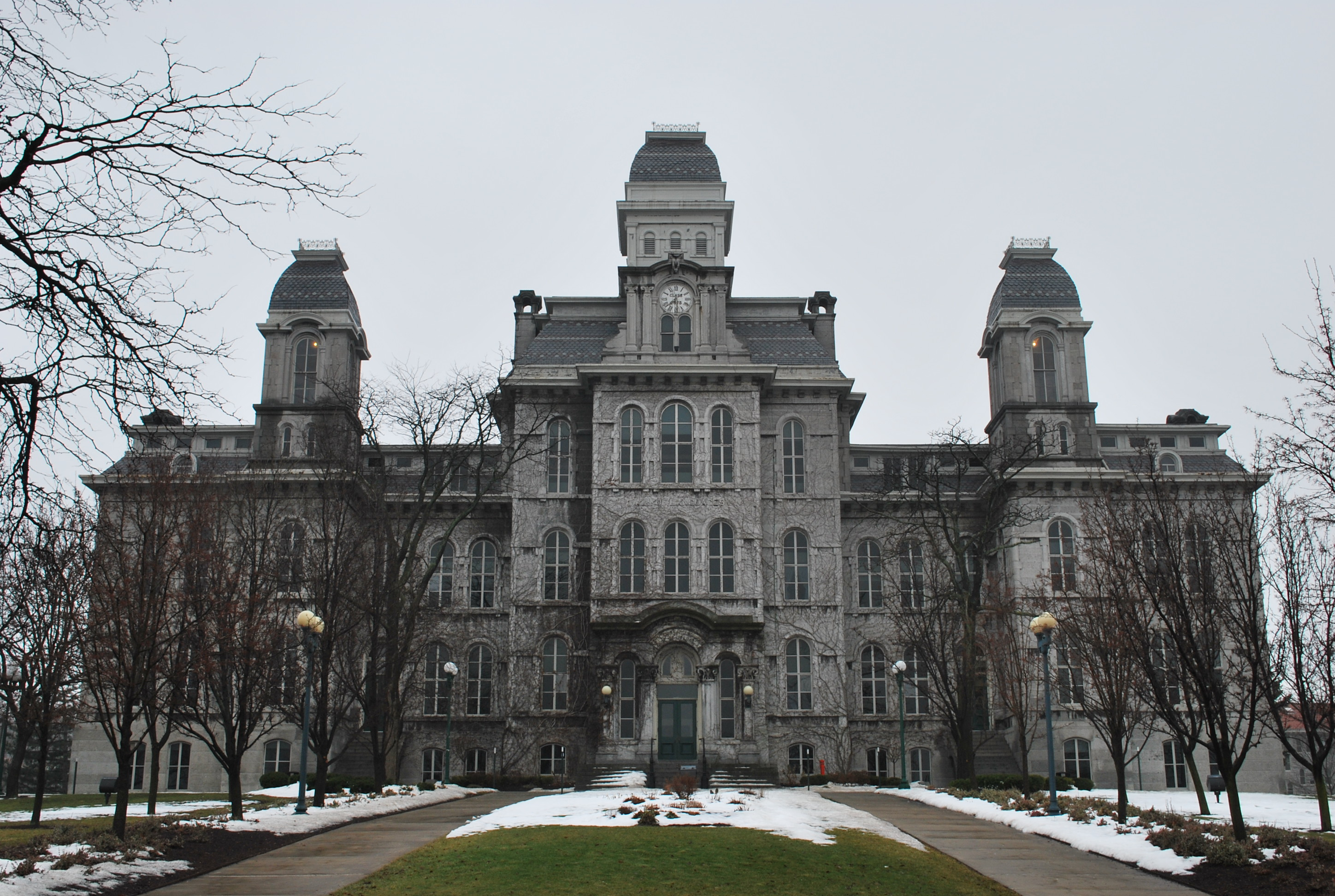
Hall of Languages

Also called "North Campus," the Main Campus contains nearly all academic buildings and residence halls. Its centerpiece is The Kenneth A. Shaw Quadrangle, more affectionately known as "The Quad", which is surrounded by academic and administrative buildings, including Hendricks Chapel. The North Campus represents a large portion of the University Hill neighborhood. Buses run to South Campus, as well as downtown Syracuse and other locations in the city.

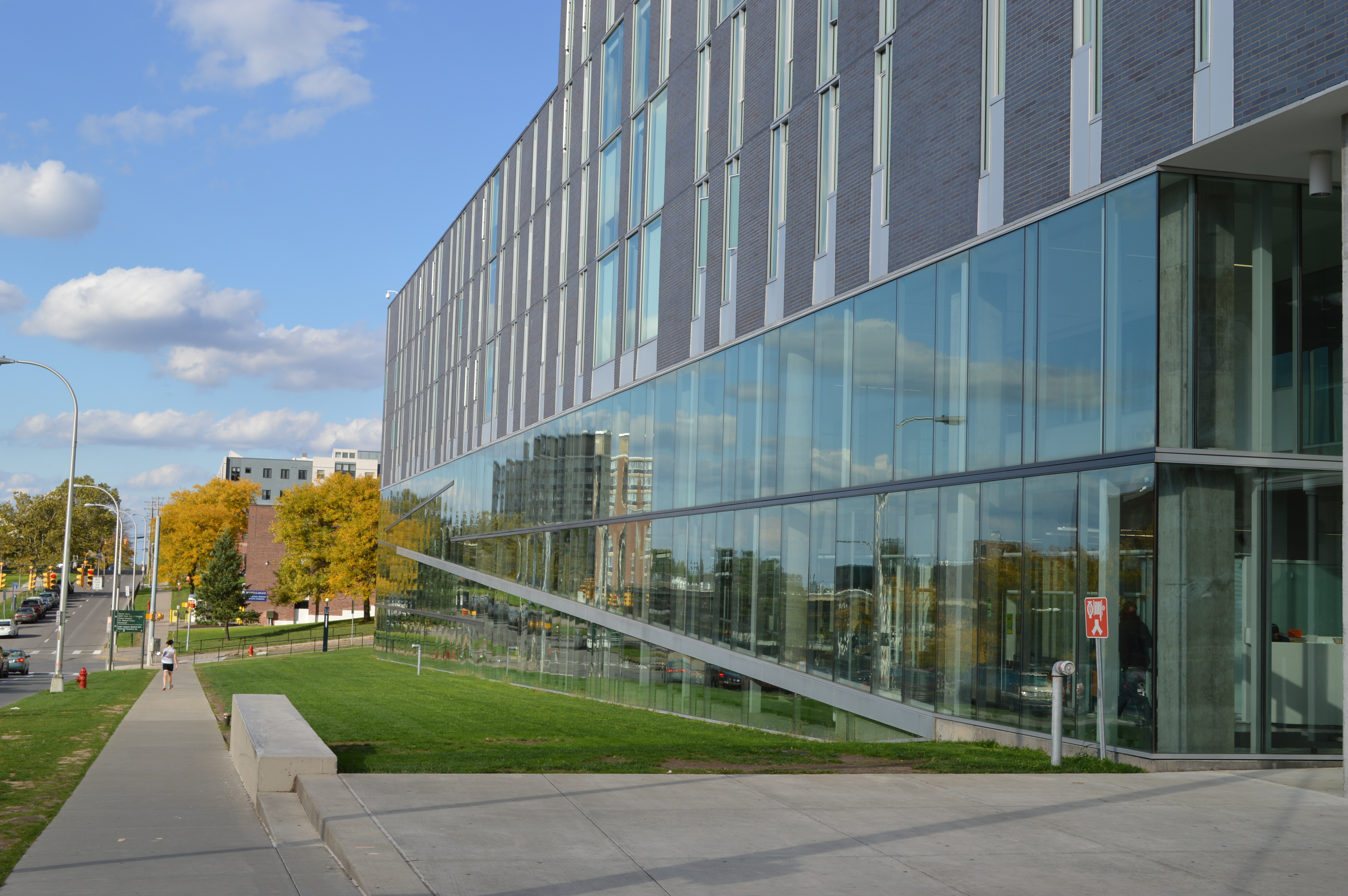
Ernie Davis Hall, a residence and dining hall opened in 2009

About 70 percent of students live in university housing. First- and second-year students are required to live on campus. All 22 residence halls are coeducational, and each contains a lounge, laundry facility, and various social/study spaces. Residence halls are secured with a card access system. Residence halls are located on both Main Campus and South Campus, the latter of which is a five-minute ride via bus. Learning communities and interest housing options are also available. Food facilities include six residential dining centers, two food courts, and several cafes. A few blocks walk from Main Campus on East Genesee Street, the Syracuse Stage building includes two proscenium theatres. The Storch is used primarily by the Drama Department and the Archbold is used primarily by Syracuse Stage, a professional regional theatre.

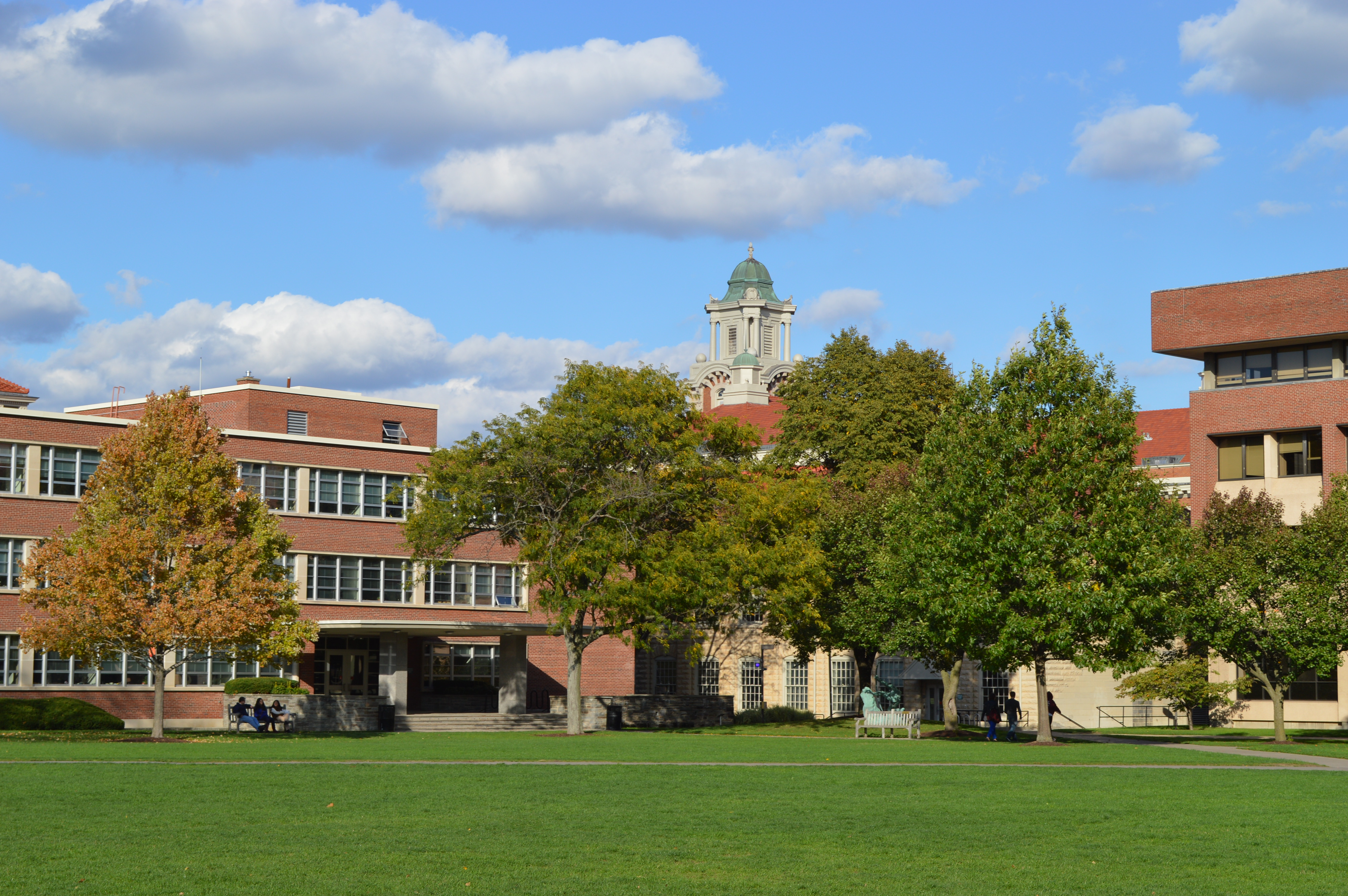
View from the Kenneth A. Shaw quadrangle, commonly known as "the Quad"

The Comstock Tract Buildings, a historic district of older buildings on the campus, was listed on the National Register of Historic Places in 1980. Three buildings on campus—the Crouse Memorial College and the Hall of Languages, and the Pi Chapter House of Psi Upsilon Fraternity—are individually listed on the National Register.

In 2017, the university released a campus framework report detailing plans to align the campus's physical landscape, buildings, and infrastructure over the next 20 years.

=== South campus ===
After World War II, a large, undeveloped hill owned by the university was used to house returning veterans in military-style campus housing. During the 1970s, this housing at Skytop was replaced by permanent two-level townhouses equipped with kitchen, bathroom, and private bedrooms for two or three undergraduate students each or graduate families. There are also three small residence halls that feature open doubles. More than 2,000 students live on the South Campus, which is one mile away from the Main Campus and connected by frequent shuttle bus service.

South Campus is home to the Institute for Sensory Research, Tennity Ice Skating Pavilion, Comstock Art Facility, Skytop Softball Stadium, Skytop Track, Goldstein Student Center, Outdoor Education Center, Skytop Office Building, and the Inn Complete pub, a graduate student bar.

Just north is the headquarters of SU Athletics, the John A. Lally Athletics Complex, formerly known as Manley Field House. Named after alumnus John Lally, the academic and athletics village is home to 20 Syracuse University athletics teams. The complex is surrounded by other athletic facilities, including the Carmelo K. Anthony Basketball Center, J.S. Coyne Stadium, Ensley Athletic Center, and SU Soccer Stadium.

=== Downtown Syracuse ===
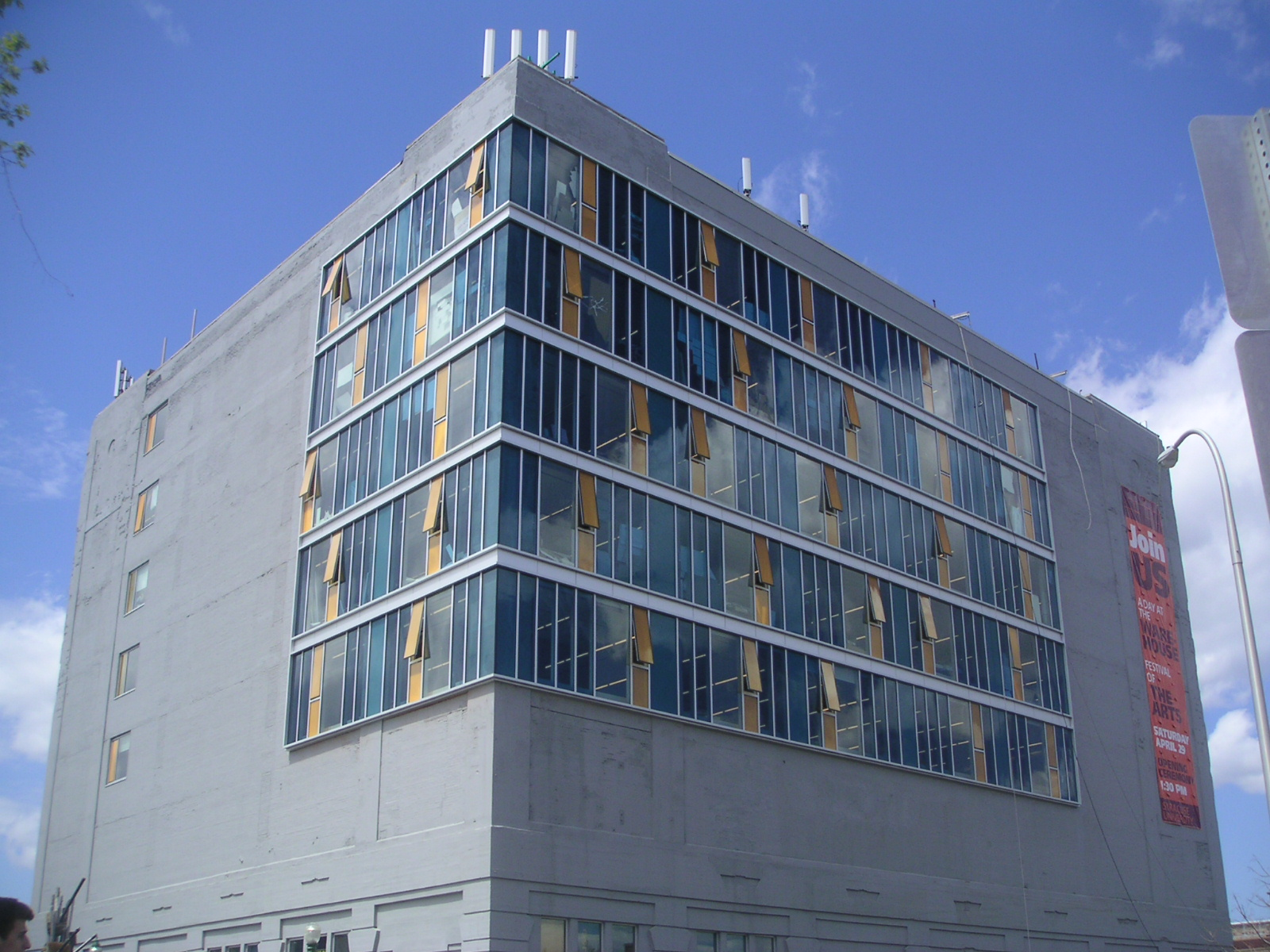
The Warehouse

In December 2004, the university announced that it had purchased or leased twelve buildings in downtown Syracuse. Five design programs—Communication, Advertising, Environmental and Interior Design, Industrial and Interactive Design, and Fashion—reside permanently in the newly renovated facilities, fittingly called The Warehouse, which was renovated by Gluckman Mayner Architects. Both programs were chosen to be located in the downtown area because of their history of working on projects directly with the community. The Warehouse also houses a contemporary art space that commissions, exhibits, and promotes the work of local and international artists in a variety of media. Hundreds of students and faculty have also been affected by the temporary move of the School of Architecture downtown for the $12 million renovation of its campus facility, Slocum Hall.

Since 2009, the Syracuse Center of Excellence in Environmental and Energy Systems, led by Syracuse University in partnership with Clarkson University and the State University of New York College of Environmental Science and Forestry, creates innovations in environmental and energy technologies that improve human health and productivity, security, and sustainability in urban and built environments. The Paul Robeson Performing Arts Company and the Community Folk Art Center will also be located downtown. On March 31, 2006, the university and the city announced an initiative to connect the main campus of the university with the arts and culture areas of downtown Syracuse and The Warehouse. Using natural gas, the Green Data Center generates its electricity on-site, providing cooling for servers and for a neighboring building.

The Connective Corridor project, supported by of public and private funds, will be a strip of cultural development that will connect the main campus of the university to downtown Syracuse. In 2008, an engineering firm was studying traffic patterns and lighting to commence the project. A design competition was held to determine the best design for the project.

=== Metropolitan satellite locations ===
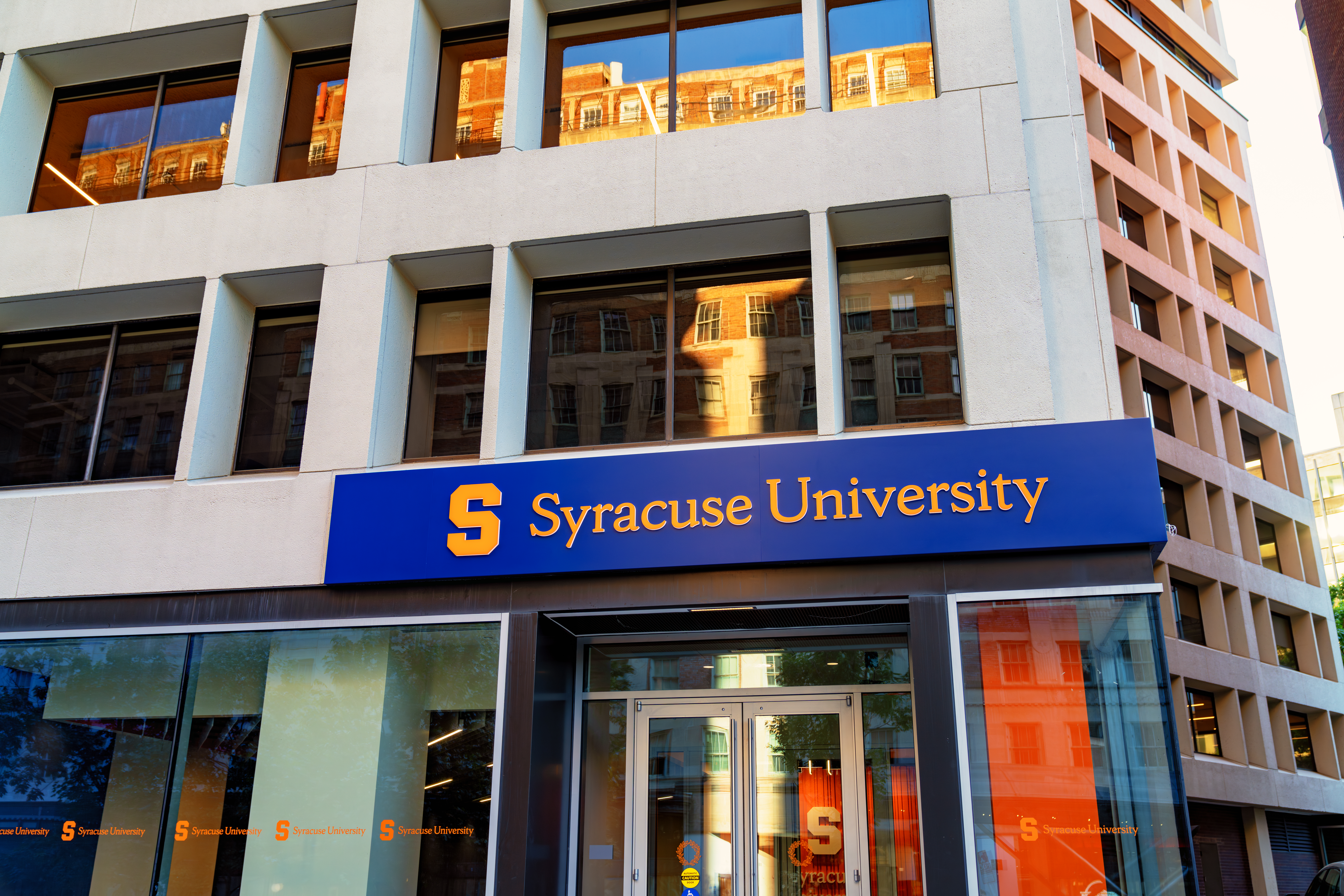
Syracuse University center at 1333 New Hampshire Avenue NW, Dupont Circle, Washington D.C.

SU has established an admissions presence in Los Angeles, California, that will enhance the university's visibility on the West Coast and will join the university's West Coast offices of alumni relations, institutional advancement, and the LA semester program in the same location. Syracuse University has also established an admissions presence in New York City, Atlanta, Georgia, Chicago, Illinois, and Boston, Massachusetts. Maxwell School of Citizenship and Public Affairs maintains their Washington D.C. operations in collaboration with Center for Strategic and International Studies. Also in Washington, D.C. is the newly launched Center for Democracy, Journalism and Citizenship, a research center jointly run by the Newhouse School and Maxwell School.

=== Art ===
==== Art collections ====
Syracuse is home to the Syracuse University Art Museum. The main gallery space is located in the Shaffer Art Building on the main campus.

The Warehouse Gallery is a new contemporary art space that is operated under the umbrella of the SU Art Museum. Housed in a former furniture warehouse off-campus, the Warehouse Gallery features works from international artists in a variety of media.

The Louise and Bernard Palitz Gallery is located on the second floor of the Lubin House in New York City. It has a rotation of exhibitions, including two annual public shows, local and regional artists, featured items from the university's art collection, and professional artists.

==== Other venues ====
There are many other venues for student work at Syracuse University, including the Lowe Art Gallery in Shaffer Art Building, the Robert B Menschel Photography Gallery that features work from professional photographers as well as students and local artists, and the White Cube Gallery in Schine Student Center that showcases work for the student body outside of the school of art and design.

SU has a permanent art collection of over 45,000 objects from artists including Picasso, Rembrandt, Hopper, Tiffany and Wyeth. More than 100 important paintings, sculptures, and murals are displayed in public places around campus. Notable sculptures on campus include Sol LeWitt's Six Curved Walls, Anna Hyatt Huntington's Diana, Jean-Antoine Houdon's George Washington, Antoine Bourdelle's Herakles, James Earle Fraser's Lincoln, Malvina Hoffman's The Struggle of Elemental Man, and Ivan Meštrović's Moses, Job and Supplicant Persephone. A mural version of Ben Shahn's The Passion of Sacco and Vanzetti adorns an exterior wall at HBC.

Students can also research primary sources through the Special Collections Research Center (SCRC), which is composed of rare books, manuscripts, works of architecture and design, and popular culture (cartoons, science fiction, and pulp literature), photography, the history of recorded sound, and more. SCRC is part of Syracuse University Libraries and is located on the 6th floor of Bird Library.

== Academics ==
School founding
School	Year founded
College of Arts and Sciences	1871
College of Visual and Performing Arts	1873
School of Architecture	1873
College of Law	1895
School of Information Studies	1896
College of Engineering and Computer Science	1901
School of Education	1906
Graduate School	1912
Falk College of Sport	1917
College of Professional Studies	1918
Whitman School of Management	1919
Maxwell School of Citizenship and Public Affairs	1924
Newhouse School of Public Communications	1934

Syracuse is a comprehensive, highly residential research university. The majority of enrollments are in the full-time, four-year undergraduate program that balances arts & sciences and professions. There is a high graduate coexistence with the comprehensive graduate program and a very high level of research activity. It is accredited by the Middle States Commission on Higher Education.

The most popular majors at Syracuse University include: Communication, Journalism, and Related Programs; Social Sciences; Business, Management, Marketing, and Related Support Services; Visual and Performing Arts; and Engineering. The average freshman retention rate, an indicator of student satisfaction, is 91 percent. The student-faculty ratio at Syracuse University is 15:1, and the school has 58.5 percent of its classes with fewer than 20 students.

=== Organization ===
Syracuse is governed by a 70-member board of trustees with 64 trustees elected by the board to four-year terms and six elected by the alumni to four-year terms. Of the 64 board-elected trustees, three must represent specified conferences of the United Methodist Church. In addition, the Chancellor and the President of the Syracuse Alumni Association serve as ex officio voting trustees. Two students and one faculty member serve as non-voting representatives on the board. The board selects, and sets the salary of, the chancellor. The university bylaws also establish a university senate with "general supervision over all educational matters concerning the University as a whole". The senate consists of administrators, faculty, students and staff.

Syracuse University is organized into 13 schools and colleges.

=== Admissions ===
Undergraduate admissions statistics
- 2023 entering class
- Admit rate: 41.7% (▼ −8.17)
- Yield rate: 20.9% ( +0.3)

Test scores middle 50%^{[i]}
- SAT Total: 1280–1410 (among 24% of FTFs)
- ACT Composite: 28–32 (among 9% of FTFs)

High school GPA
- Average: 3.8

Syracuse's admissions process is "more selective" according to the Carnegie Classification. For the 2023 incoming class, Syracuse accepted 17,545 of its 42,089 applicants, or 41.69 percent. 3,672 students enrolled in the class, a yield rate of 20.93 percent. In 2024, the school received around 45,000 applications.

In 2018, 26% of the incoming students were students of color; 18% were first-generation college students; 21% were federal Pell grant eligible (an indicator for low-income students), and 75% received some financial aid. Students came from 48 states, along with Washington, D.C., Guam and Puerto Rico. Nearly 600 international undergraduate students from 59 countries were also admitted.

In fall 2024, Syracuse University had a total acceptance rate of 45.9%.

=== Degrees ===
The university offers undergraduate degrees in over 200 majors in the nine undergraduate schools and colleges. Bachelor's degrees are offered through the Syracuse University School of Architecture, the College of Arts and Sciences, the School of Education, the David B. Falk College of Sport, the College of Engineering and Computer Science, the School of Information Studies, Martin J. Whitman School of Management, S.I. Newhouse School of Public Communications, and the College of Visual and Performing Arts. Also offered are Master's and doctoral degrees online and in person from the Graduate School and from specialized programs in the Martin J. Whitman School of Management, Maxwell School of Citizenship and Public Affairs, College of Law, among others. Additionally, SU offers Certificates of Advanced Study Programs for specialized programs for education, counseling, and other academic areas. SU also offers over 100 minors.

The university has offered multiple international study programs since 1911. SU Abroad, formerly known as the Division of International Programs Abroad (DIPA), currently offers joint programs with universities in over 40 countries. The university operates eight international centers, called SU Abroad Centers, that offer structured programs in a variety of academic disciplines. The centers are located at Beijing, Istanbul, Florence, Hong Kong, London (Faraday House), Madrid, Strasbourg, and Santiago.

=== Rankings and reputation ===
Academic rankings

National
- Forbes: 108
- U.S. News & World Report: 75
- Washington Monthly: 97
- WSJ/College Pulse: 117

Global
- ARWU: 801–900
- QS: 731-740
- THE: 401–500
- U.S. News & World Report: 482

National programs rankings
Program	Ranking
Audiology	29
Biological Sciences	112
Business	84
Chemistry	96
Clinical Psychology	50
Computer Science	68
Earth Sciences	54
Economics	50
Education	55
Engineering	111
English	73
Fine Arts	53
History	67
Law	102
Library & Information Studies	6
Mathematics	74
Physics	69
Political Science	50
Psychology	90
Public Affairs	1
Social Work	59
Sociology	61
Speech–Language Pathology	32

Online programs rankings
Program	Ranking
Master's in Computer Information Technology	19
Master's in Computer Information Technology for Veterans	11
Master's in Business Programs (excluding MBA)	47
Master's in Business Programs for Veterans (excluding MBA)	25
MBA Programs	54
MBA Programs for Veterans	32
Bachelor's Programs	133

Global programs rankings
Program	Ranking
Arts & Humanities	218
Economics & Business	232
Engineering	899
Physics	245
Social Sciences & Public Health	221

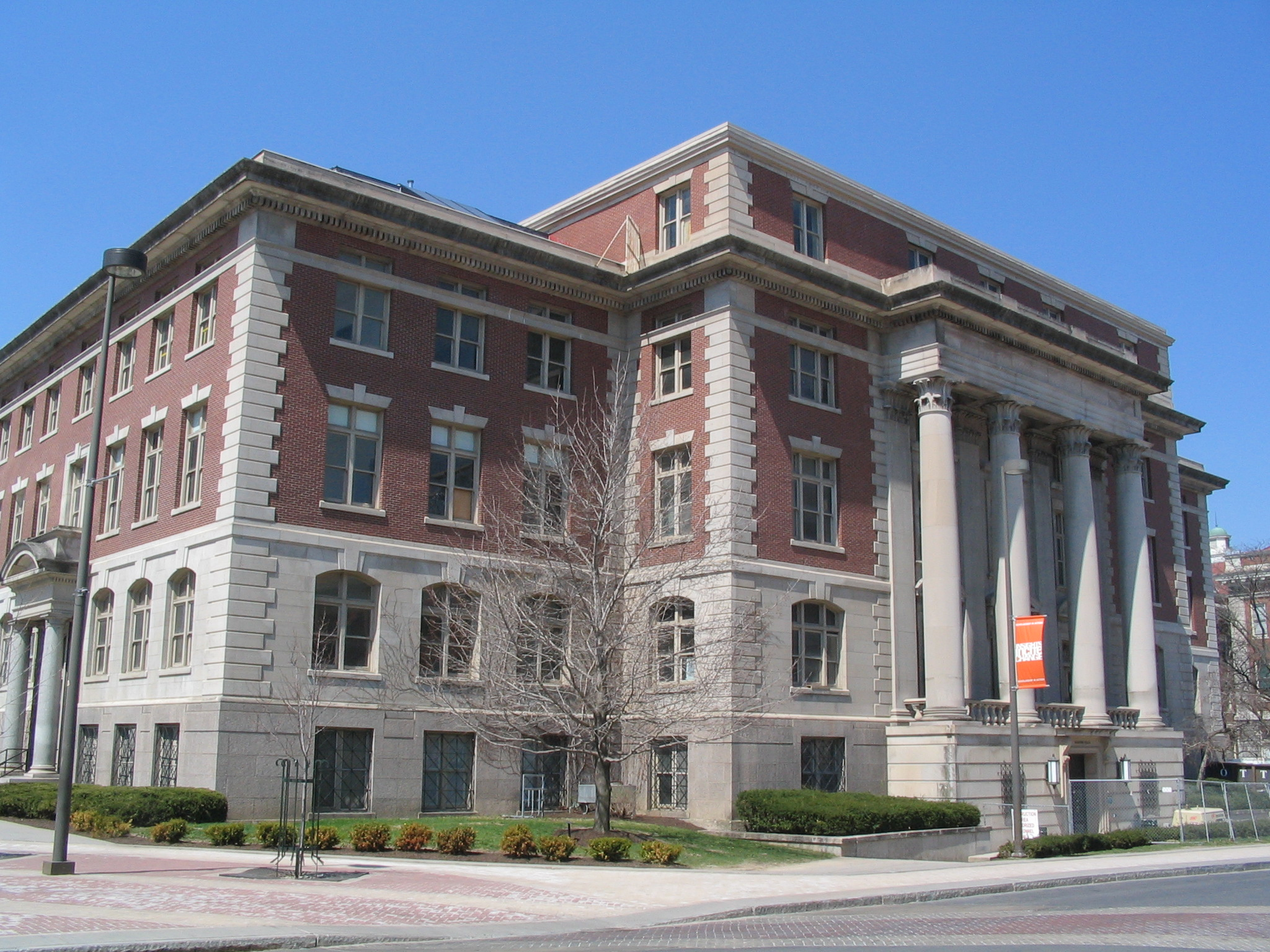
Slocum Hall, The School of Architecture

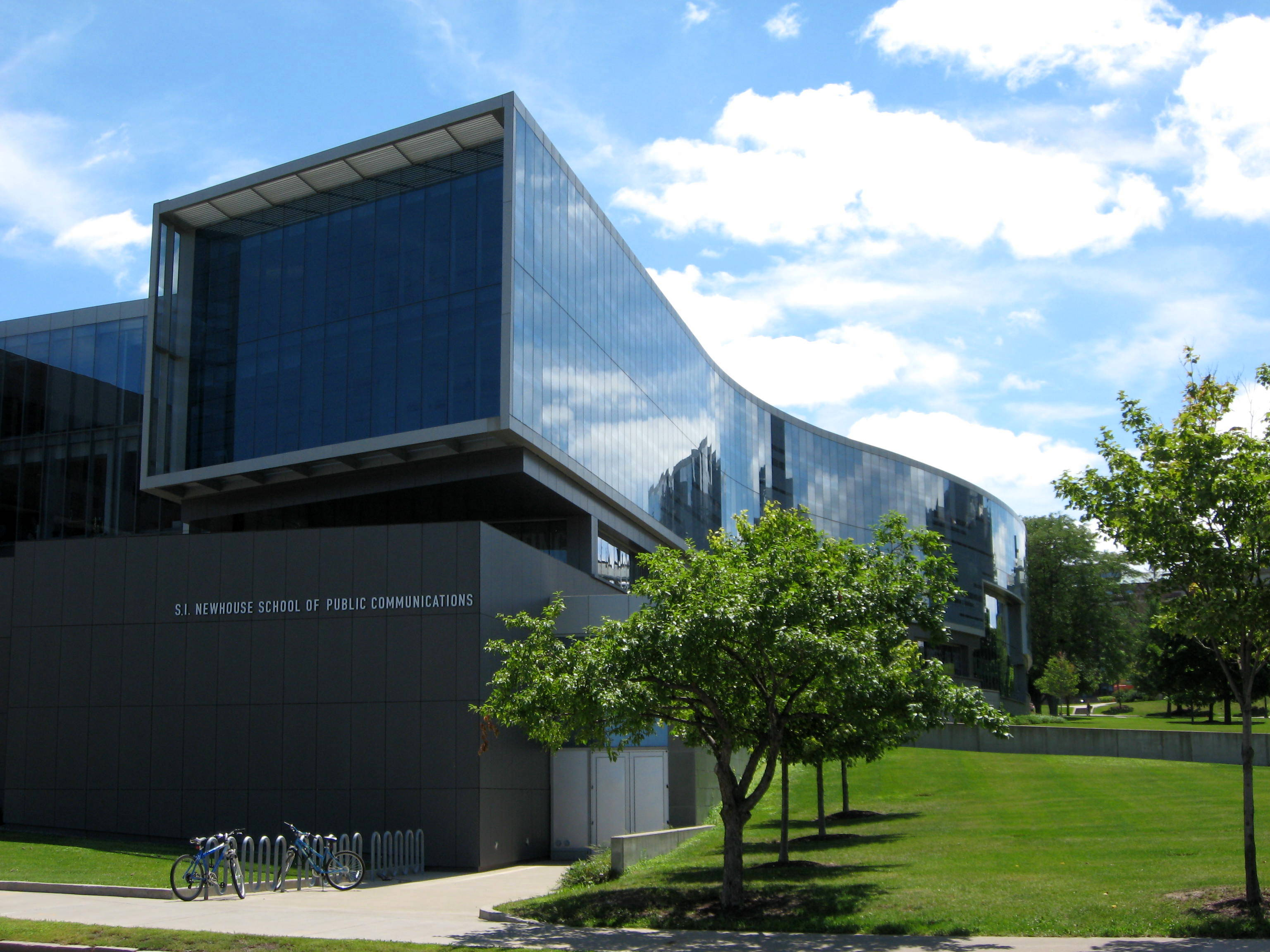
S.I. Newhouse School of Public Communications

In its 2021 ranking of U.S. colleges, U.S. News & World Report ranked Syracuse tied for 58th among undergraduate national universities. A 2019 survey in the Academic Ranking of World Universities places Syracuse University in the top 100 world universities in social sciences. In 2019, Syracuse University was ranked 22nd in New York State by average professor salaries. Syracuse was ranked 1st in The Princeton Review's 2015 and 2019 list of top party schools. SU was named as one of top Fulbright Award producing institutions for 2020–21.

The Newhouse School of Communications (formally S. I. Newhouse School of Public Communications) offers 7 undergraduate and 12 master's degree programs. It has an undergraduate acceptance rate of about 10%; incoming students have, on average, a 3.9 GPA and SAT scores in the 1320 range and ACT scores of 30.

The School of Architecture Bachelor of Architecture program was ranked 5th nationally in both the most Hired from and most admired categories by the journal Design Intelligence in its 2019–20 rankings.

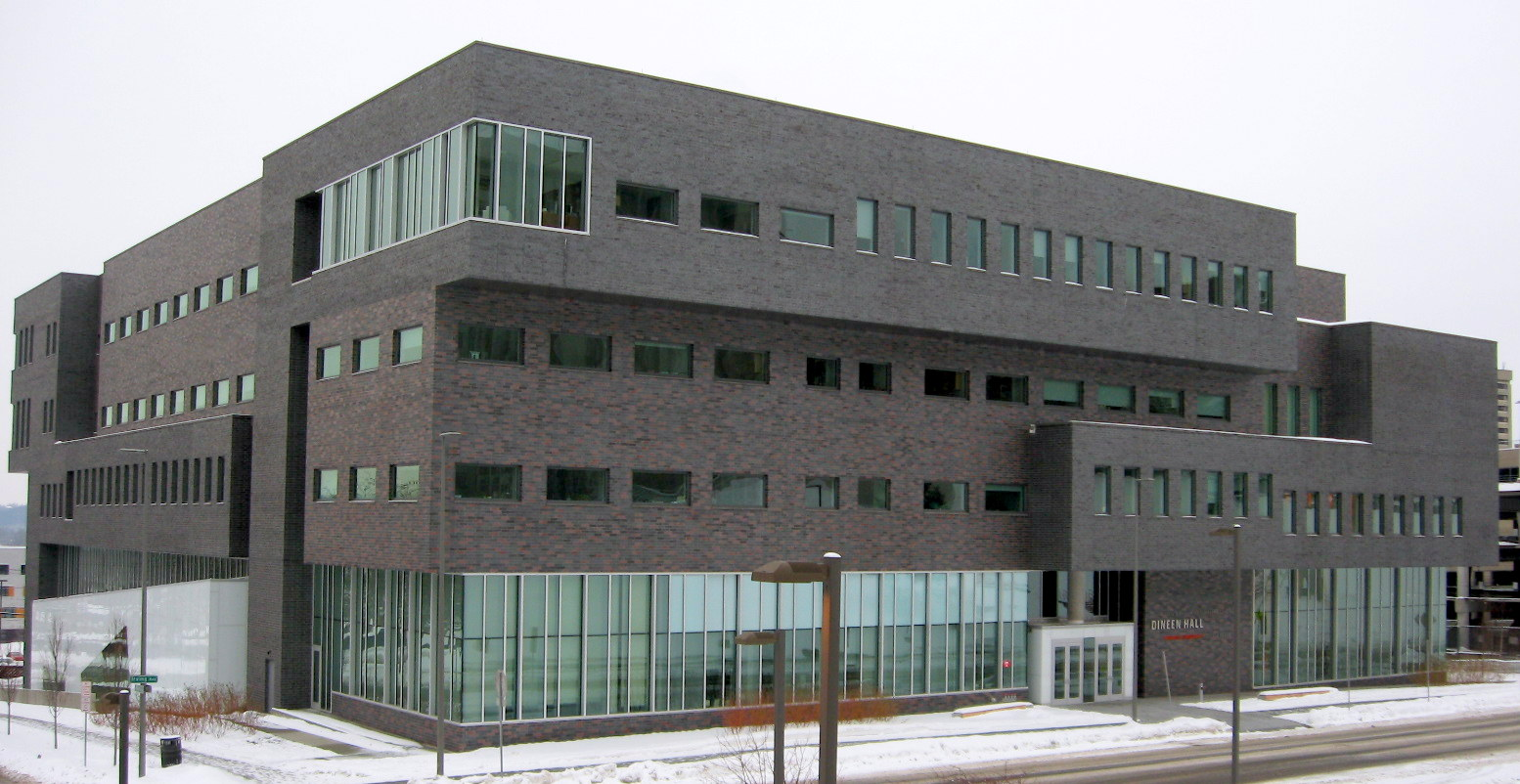
Dineen Hall, the College of Law

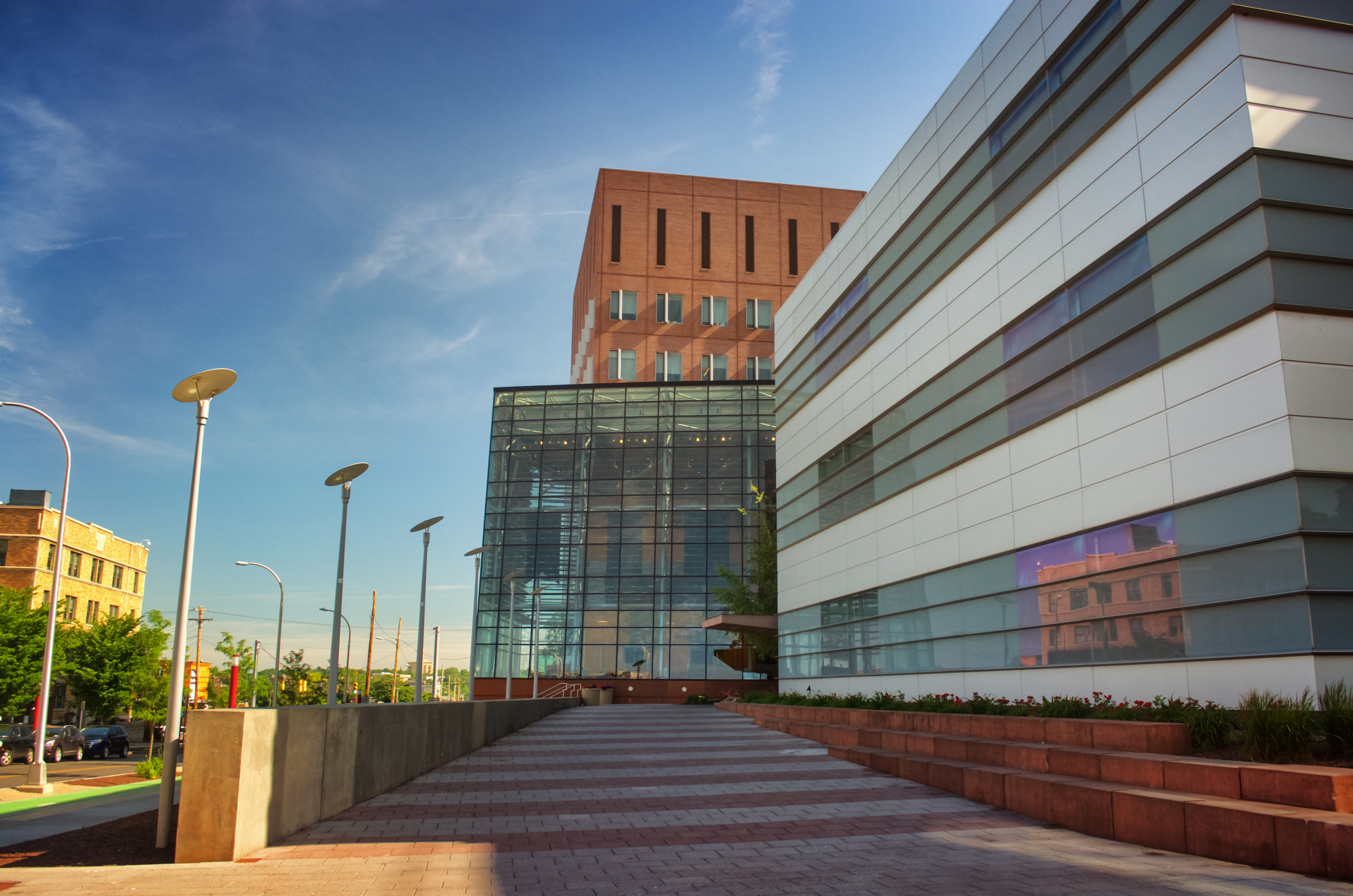
Martin J. Whitman School of Management

The School of Information Studies offers information management and technology courses at the undergraduate and graduate levels at Syracuse University. Within the School of Information Studies, U.S. News & World Report has ranked the graduate program as the 6th best Library and Information Studies graduate school in the United States for 2022, with the graduate program in School Library Media ranked 3rd, the graduate program in Digital Librarianship ranked 4th, and the graduate Information Systems program tied at No. 5.

The School of Management was renamed the Martin J. Whitman School of Management in 2003, in honor of Syracuse alumnus and benefactor Martin J. Whitman. The school is home to about 2,200 undergraduate and graduate students. The graduate program was ranked tied at No. 54 among business schools nationwide by U.S. News & World Report for 2025. The school was ranked No. 39 on Poets&Quants' list of the Best Undergraduate Business Programs in the U.S. in 2025.

The College of Law was ranked tied for 102nd nationally by U.S. News & World Report for 2022. It is an emerging leader in the relatively novel field of National Security Law. In 2007, the law school started the Cold Case Justice Initiative, investigating cold cases from the civil rights era in the South. Its professors and students have identified 196 cases, of which more than 100 are in Georgia, and will give information to the US Department of Justice to have cases prosecuted. The FBI has identified 122 cold cases that it is trying to resolve. Former U.S. President Joe Biden is a graduate of the College of Law.

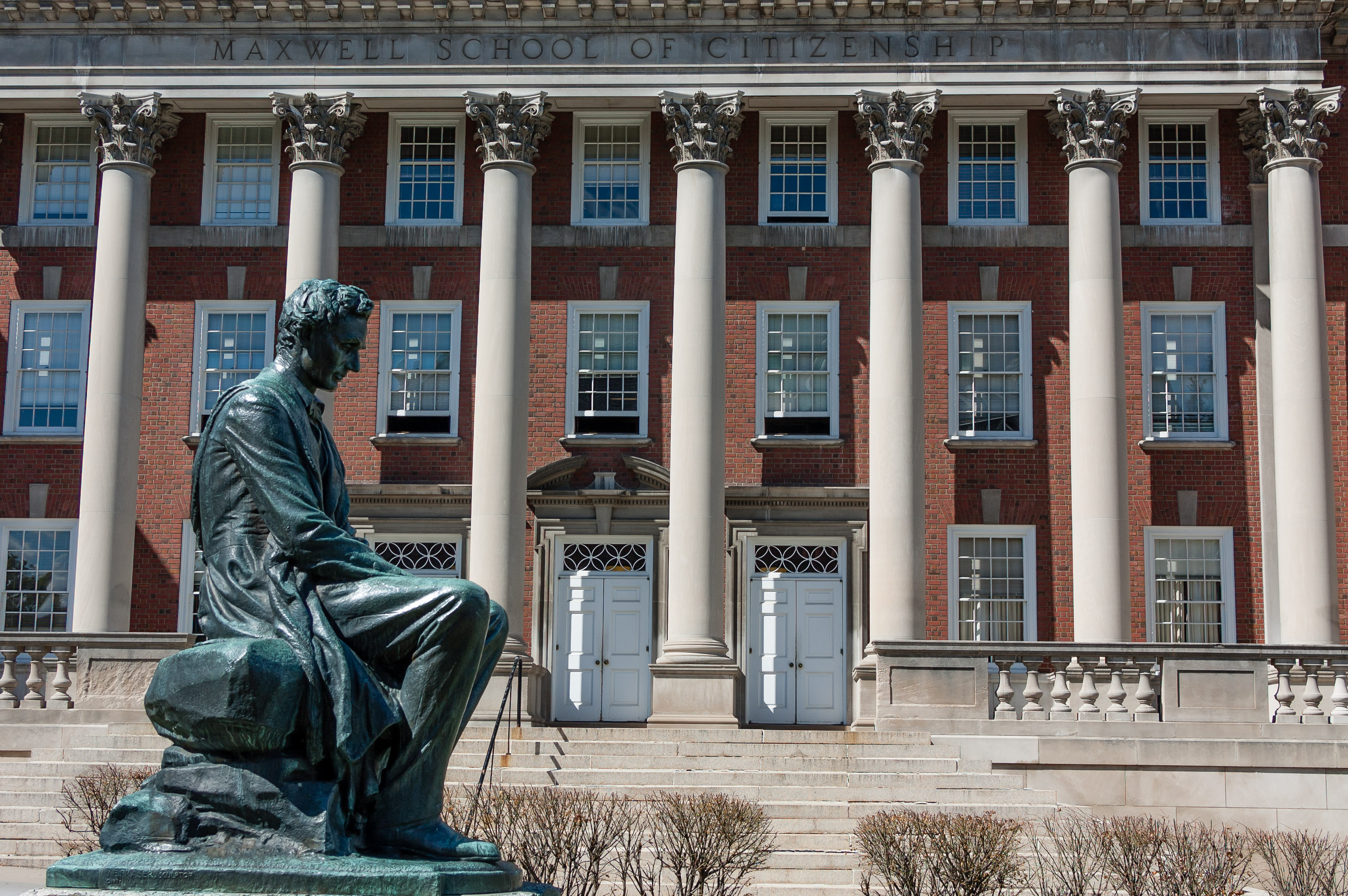
The statue of Abraham Lincoln outside the Maxwell School of Citizenship and Public Affairs

The Maxwell School of Citizenship and Public Affairs combines social sciences with public administration and international relations. It was ranked as the No. 1 graduate school for public affairs in the U.S. by U.S. News & World Report for 2022.

Military Times ranked Syracuse University the top "Private School for Vets" and 5th overall in the "Best for Vets" in 2020. Syracuse University was ranked tied for 30th in "Best Colleges for Veterans" by U.S. News & World Report for 2022. The school completed the $63 million state-of-the-art National Veterans Resource Center (NVRC) in 2020, the first-of-its kind facility in the United States.

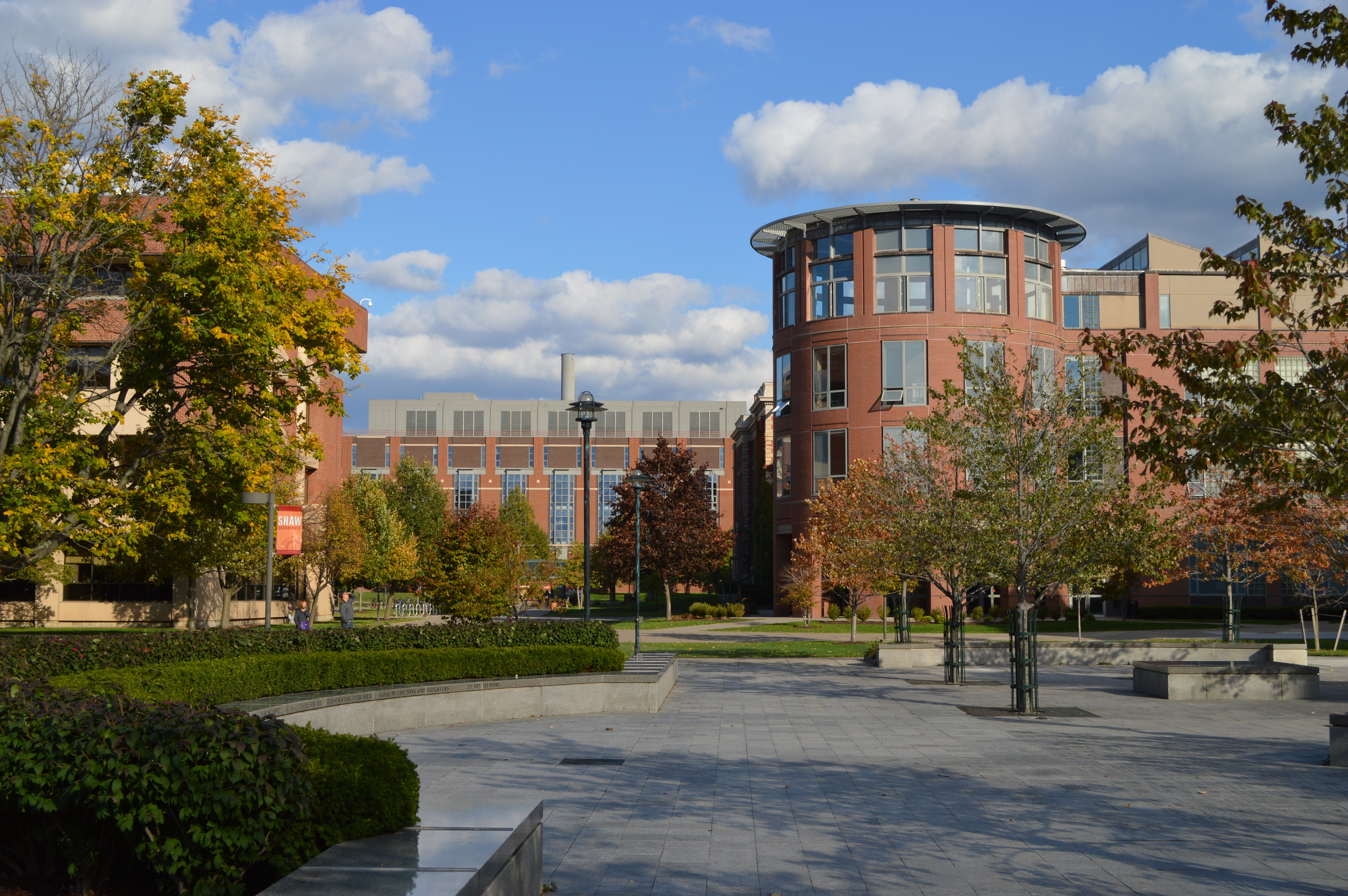
From left to right: Link Hall, Life Sciences Complex, and Shaffer Art Building

Civil liberties organization FIRE gave Syracuse its 2021 "Lifetime Censorship Award", "[f]or its unashamed assault on expressive freedoms".

=== Libraries ===
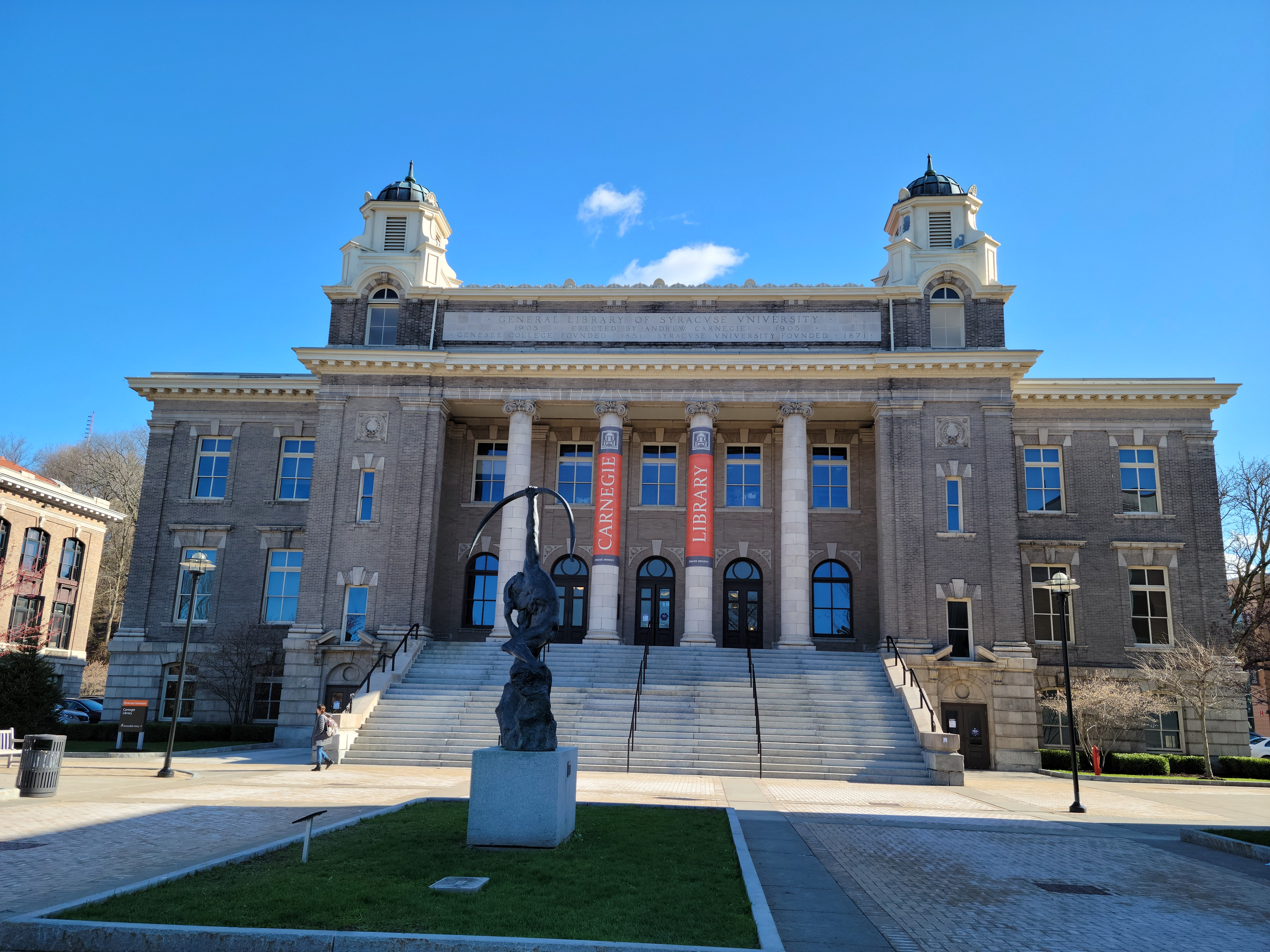
Carnegie Library at Syracuse University

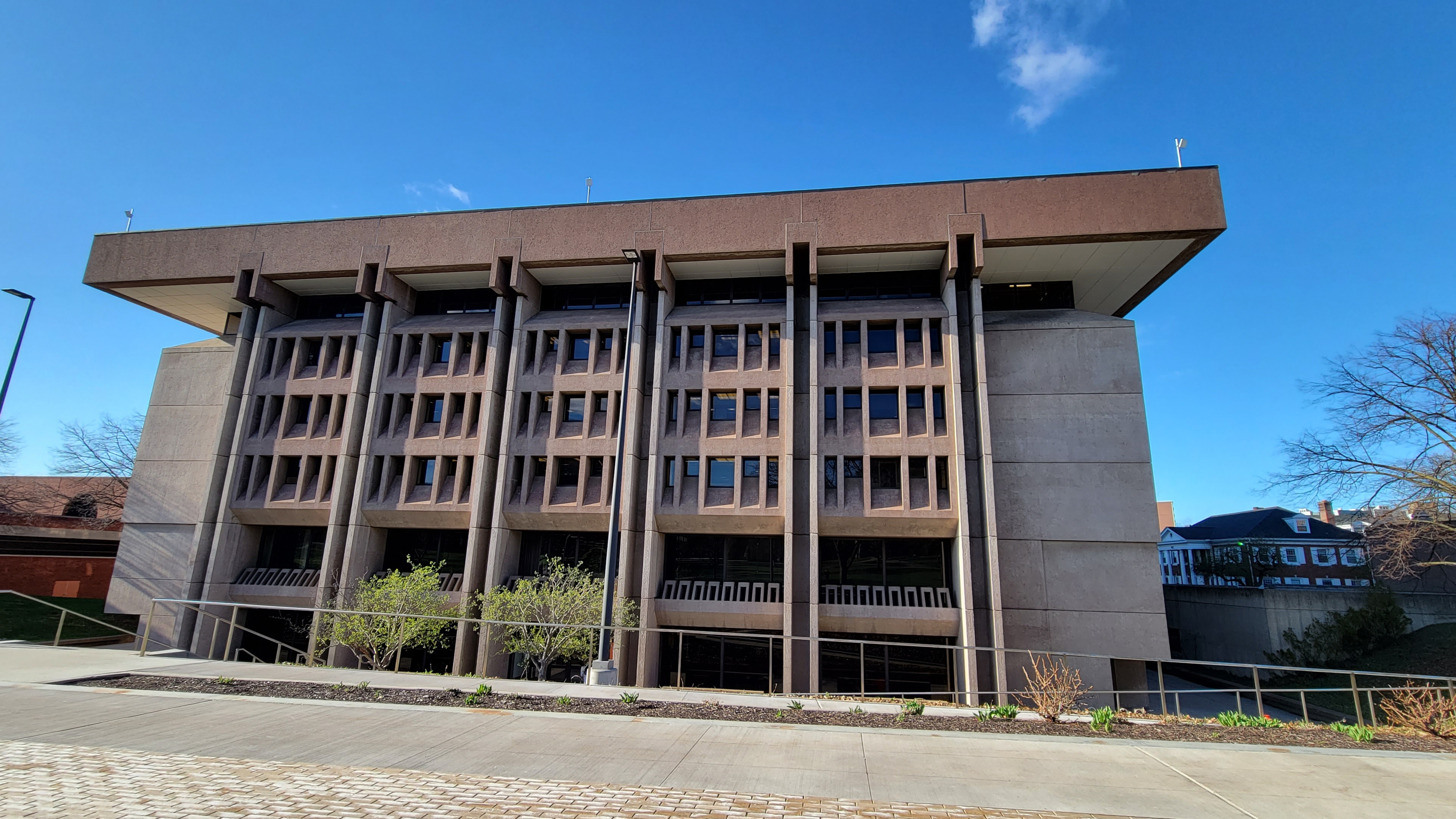
Bird Library at Syracuse University

Syracuse University's main library is the Ernest Stevenson Bird Library (Bird Library), which opened in September 1972. It is Syracuse University's busiest academic building. Its seven levels cover 227,249 square feet and include social sciences and humanities resources.

As of June 2025, the libraries held more than 4.8 million titles in its general collections and over 210,000 titles in its law collection. More than half of its general collections was electronic. It is one of the hundred largest libraries in the country. Syracuse University Libraries' provides access to its digital collections, both special and general collections, through its open access digital library. Bird Library is also home to the largest collection of national archives of Kenya and Tanzania.

Since 1878, the university has participated in the Federal Depository Library Program of the U.S. Government Publishing Office (GPO) as a Regional depository library. It was the first library to commit to permanently preserving new volumes as they are published, in addition to the print collections of historical government publications produced by the US-GPO. Bird Library provides public access to the government documents collection, located on its 3rd floor. It also collects publications from the State of New York, City of Syracuse, and Onondaga County.

The LaunchPad, located on the 1st floor of Bird Library, is a cross-disciplinary entrepreneurial and innovation hub for the campus community.

The Carnegie Library serves as a quiet reading room. It also includes team rooms and a computer workstation and printing room. In addition to Bird and Carnegie Library, Syracuse University hosts the King + King Architecture Library in Slocum Hall and the College of Law Library in Dineen Hall.

The Special Collections Research Center, located on the sixth floor of Bird Library, held 87,760 total linear feet of rare books, printed materials, original manuscripts, photographs, artworks, audio and moving image recordings, and university records, as of June 2025. SCRC's primary sources span over 4,000 years—from the 21st century BCE to the 21st century CE—and are actively used in teaching, exhibitions and research. They represent an array of subject areas relevant to Syracuse University and the local and global communities, including Activism and Social Reform, Adult Education, Architecture and Industrial Design, Recorded Sound and Broadcasting, Photography and Photojournalism and Syracuse University History. Notable collections include the Margaret Bourke-White Papers, Marcel Breuer Papers, Grove Press Records, Ted Koppel Collection, Joyce Carol Oates Papers, Plastics Collection, Gerrit Smith Papers, and the Leopold von Ranke library.

The university is also home to the SCRC's Belfer Audio Archive, whose holdings total approximately 540,000 recordings in all formats, primarily cylinders, discs, and magnetic tapes. In July 2008, Syracuse University became the owner of the second largest collection of 78 rpm records in the United States, after the Library of Congress, after a donation of more than 200,000 records. The donation, valued at $1 million, more than doubled the university's collection of 78 rpm records to about 400,000. Some of the voices found in the Belfer Collection include Thomas Edison, Amelia Earhart, and Albert Einstein. Since 2011, the libraries has produced Sound Beat, a daily 90-second audio interstitial program that airs on nearly 375 stations across the world.

Syracuse University Libraries includes a high-density, climate-controlled offsite storage and service complex known as the Facility that houses many of its collection materials.

Syracuse University Press, established in 1943, publishes scholarly books in several academic fields, as well as book on the history and environment of New York State.

The Martin Luther King Jr. Library in Sims Hall is the university's only departmental library run by a school or college, the College of Arts and Sciences. It also has a special Harriet Tubman Research Collection and an Environmental Justice and Gender collection as part of its over 15,000 acquisitions in African, African-American, Afro-Latino, and Caribbean studies.

=== Faculty ===
Syracuse University has 1013 full-time instructional faculty, 96 part-time faculty, and 454 adjunct faculty. Approximately 86% of the full-time faculty have earned PhDs or professional degrees. The current faculty includes scholars such as MacArthur Fellow Don Mitchell, Professor of Geography, who has developed studies in cultural geography; Bruce Kingma, Associate Provost and Kauffman Professor of Entrepreneurship, a pioneer in the field of information economics and online learning; Catherine Bertini, Professor of Practice in Public Administration, who has worked on the role of women in food distribution; Frederick C. Beiser, Professor of Philosophy, one of leading scholars of German idealism; Mary Karr, the Jesse Truesdell Peck Professor of Literature, who has received a Guggenheim Fellowship in poetry; John Caputo, the Thomas J. Watson Professor of Humanities, who founded weak theology; Sean O'Keefe, former chairman of Airbus Group, Inc. and former Secretary of the Navy; and political theorist Elizabeth F. Cohen.

== Research ==
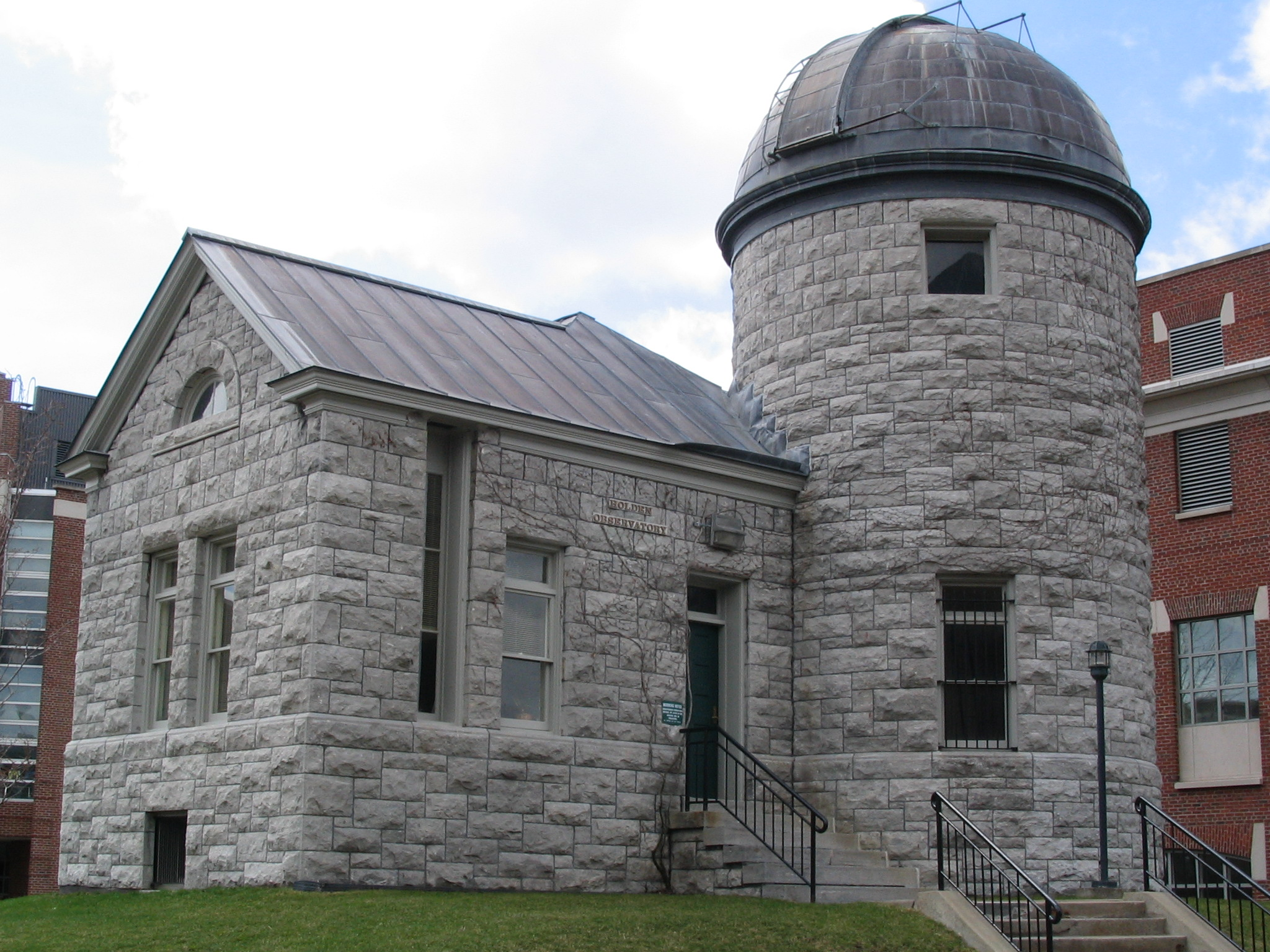
Holden Observatory, the second-oldest building at the university

Syracuse is classified among "R1: Doctoral Universities – Very High Research Activity". According to the National Science Foundation, Syracuse spent $154.3 million on research and development in FY 2019, ranking it 136th in the nation. Through the university's Office of Research, which promotes research, technology transfer, and scholarship, and its Office of Sponsored Programs, which assists faculty in seeking and obtaining external research support, SU supports research in the fields of management and business, sciences, engineering, education, information studies, energy, environment, communications, computer science, public and international affairs, and other specialized areas. Syracuse became a member of the Association of American Universities (AAU) in 1966, an organization of leading research universities devoted to maintaining a strong system of research and education. In 2011, however, the university's board of trustees voted to pull out of the research consortium due to dispute over the counting of non-Federal research dollars.

SU has established 29 research centers and institutes that focuses research, often across disciplines, in a variety of areas. The Burton Blatt Institute advances research in economic and social issues for individuals with disabilities, and it has international projects in the field. The Martin J Whitman School of Management supports the largest number of research centers, including The Ballentine Investment Institute, the George E. Bennett Center for Accounting and Tax Research, the Robert H. Brethen Operations Management Institute, Michael J. Falcone Center for Entrepreneurship, The H. H. Franklin Center for Supply Chain Management, Olivia and Walter Kiebach Center for International Business Studies, and the Earl V. Snyder Innovation Management Program. In 2010, the university launched SURFACE, an online, open-access institutional repository for research, which is run by the Syracuse University Library System.

Other research programs include The Syracuse Biomaterials Institute, the Alan K. Campbell Public Affairs Institute through the Maxwell School, the Center for the Study of Popular Television through the Newhouse School of Public Communications, and La Casita Cultural Center—a 2011 research program focused on cultural memory, child development, and latino studies.

Syracuse University also has collaborations with CERN and Fermilab, among other institutes. Syracuse also has a comparatively large number of collaborators on the LIGO Scientific Collaboration, which led to the first observation of gravitational waves in 2015. The Center for Gravitational Wave Astronomy and Astrophysics researches gravitational waves astronomy, designing of Cosmic Explorer next-gen observatory, development new quantum optics technologies and precision measurement to build new detectors.

In June 2022, Syracuse University announced the launch of the Center for Democracy, Journalism and Citizenship, a collaborative initiative between the Newhouse School and Maxwell School, in Washington D.C. The center aims to address the loss of trust in journalism and democracy, political polarization, and the deterioration of civil discourse. It will host prominent speakers at public events, sponsor scholarly and applied research, and provide students with an opportunity to spend a semester in Washington D.C.

=== Syracuse University Press ===
Syracuse University Press has several areas of focus: Middle East studies, Native American studies, peace and conflict resolution, Irish studies and Jewish studies, New York State, television and popular culture, sports and entertainment. The press was founded on August 2, 1943, by Chancellor William Pearson Tolley and benefactor Thomas J. Watson. It is a member of the Association of American University Presses.

== Student life ==
Student body composition as of May 2, 2022
Race and ethnicity	Total
White	55%
Foreign national	14%
Hispanic	10%
Black	7%
Other (Note: Other consists of Multiracial Americans & those who prefer to not say.)	7%
Asian	7%
Native American	1%
Economic diversity
Low-income (Note: The percentage of students who received an income-based federal Pell grant intended for low-income students.)	14%
Affluent (Note: The percentage of students who are a part of the American middle class at the bare minimum.)	86%

Syracuse University students population from all 50 US states and over 127 countries. 52% of the 2020 class were women. Approximately 15 percent of students are from outside of the US, and are supported by the Center for International Services within the university's Division of Student Affairs.

=== Media ===
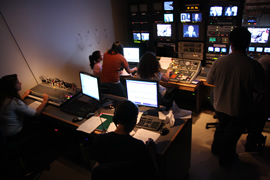
The CitrusTV control room during a taping of CitrusTV News

CitrusTV (formerly UUTV, HillTV and Synapse) is the university's entirely student-run television studio and one of the largest student-run TV studios in the country, with over 300 active members.

There are also multiple student-run magazines and other print publications, including: The Onondagan Yearbook (defunct), The Daily Orange, Student Voice, Perception, Jerk Magazine, What the Health, 360, Baked Magazine, The Out Crowd, and Equal Time. The Daily Orange, a fully independent student newspaper published since 1903, is free and published daily during the Syracuse University academic year. It is often ranked among the best student newspapers in the United States.

WAER, a radio station owned by the university, features jazz music, NPR, and Syracuse Orange play-by-play programming around the clock. It is best known for its sports staff, which has produced many prominent sportscasters. WJPZ-FM and WERW are independent student-run radio stations and feature Top 40 (CHR), underground rock music, world music, folk music, occasional news, and some political or public affairs programs.

=== Student government ===
Founded in 1957, the Student Association (SA) represents the undergraduate students of both SU and ESF. SA elects a President and Vice President (on a unified ticket) each academic year. They also each year elect a Comptroller, who, with the assembly, oversees the allocation and designation of the Student Activity Fee that was first collected in the 1968–69 school year. The goals of SA are to participate through a unified student voice in the formulation of Syracuse University rules and regulations. The SA-SGA Alumni Organization maintains the history and an organizational timeline on its website.

The graduate students at Syracuse University are represented by the Graduate Student Organization (GSO), while the law students at Syracuse University are represented by the Law Student Senate. Each of the three organizations elects students to serve in the Syracuse University Senate, which also includes faculty, staff, and administrators.

=== Fraternities and sororities ===
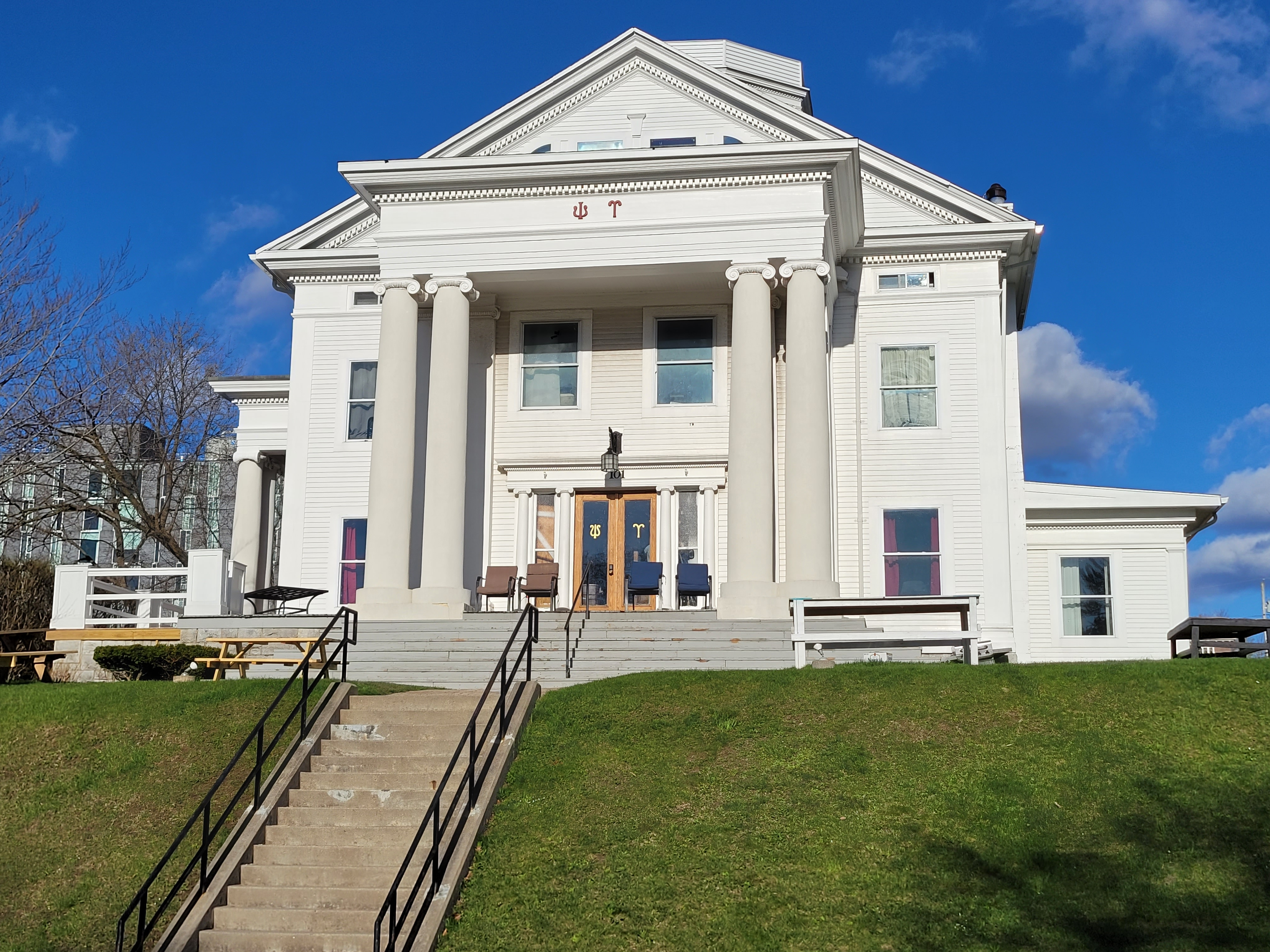
Pi Chapter House of Psi Upsilon Fraternity

The Syracuse University fraternity and sorority system offers organizations that are members of the Panhellenic Council (NPC), the Interfraternity Council (IFC), the National Association of Latino Fraternal Organizations, the National Multicultural Greek Council, the Professional Fraternity Council (PFC), and the National Pan-Hellenic Council (NPHC). In addition to SU students, ESF students are permitted to join the university's fraternity and sorority system.

The oldest fraternity at SU is Delta Kappa Epsilon, which established a chapter in 1871 soon after the founding of the university, followed by Psi Upsilon in 1875 and Phi Kappa Psi in 1884. Sororities were also a part of the early history of SU. Alpha Phi was founded at SU in 1872, followed by Gamma Phi Beta in 1874 (first organization to use the term "sorority"), and Alpha Gamma Delta in 1904. Alpha Phi Alpha established a chapter at SU in 1910 and was reorganized in 1949 and 1973. The first NPHC fraternity, Omega Psi Phi, was established at SU in 1922, and the first NPHC sorority, Delta Sigma Theta in 1973. Alpha Phi Delta, the only historically Italian-American heritage fraternity, was founded at SU in 1914. University policy prohibits fraternities and sororities from discriminating "on the basis of race, creed, color, gender, national origin, religion, marital status, age, disability, sexual orientation, or status as a disabled veteran or a veteran of the Vietnam era."

=== Syracuse University Ambulance ===
Syracuse University Ambulance, commonly referred to as SUA, is a SU Health Services-based student organization that responds to over 1,500 medical emergencies each year. SUA was formed in 1973 by a group of students out of a need for emergency medical services on campus. Starting with only a few members and meager equipment, the Syracuse University Medical Crisis Unit was formed. The organization has evolved greatly over time but, with 100 volunteer students, remains a student-run organization to this day. SUA provides emergency and non-emergency services 24 hours a day, seven days a week during the academic school year, and is funded by a portion of the student health fee. Providing intermediate life support (ILS), rapid cardiac defibrillation, emergency and non-emergency transportation, and special event standby services, SUA operates two full-time transporting ambulances, a supervisor's fly car, and a MCI trailer for mass-casualty incidents. Additionally, SUA operates four transport vans for non-emergency transports. Advanced life support (ALS) mutual aid is provided by the City of Syracuse's private EMS provider, American Medical Response (AMR).

=== Programming board ===
University Union (UU) is the official programming board of the university, established in 1962. It is entirely run by a team of dedicated students and is one of the largest registered student organizations at SU in terms of budget, membership, size, and frequency of events. University Union hosts large-scale concert events including the annual Juice Jam festival in September and Block Party in April. Additionally, UU keeps the campus entertained throughout the year with the smaller Bandersnatch Concert Series, weekly cinemas screenings, special advanced screenings, and events featuring popular comedians and speakers.

The Goon Squad is a volunteer group whose student members welcome new students and their families at their residence halls during orientation. One of the oldest traditions at Syracuse, the group formed in 1944, and is part of Syracuse's official welcoming committee.

=== Spiritual life ===
Hendricks Chapel is an interfaith chapel located on the Quad, and serves as the spiritual center of Syracuse University. The chapel is home to ten chaplaincies, including Baptist, Buddhist, Evangelical Christian, Historically Black Churches, Islamic, Jewish, Lutheran, Pagan, Methodist, and Roman Catholic. In addition, there are a number of student spiritual groups, including groups associated with the chaplaincies as well as Adventist, Christian Science, Baháʼí, Hindu, Jainist, Mormon, Shinto, Sikh, Orthodox Christian, Pentecostal, Taoist, and more.

Additional buildings located on campus support specific spiritual groups, including the Alibrandi Catholic Center and the Winnick Hillel Center for Jewish Life. Off campus, the Chabad House and Islamic Society of CNY also support student spiritual life.

=== Campus food ===
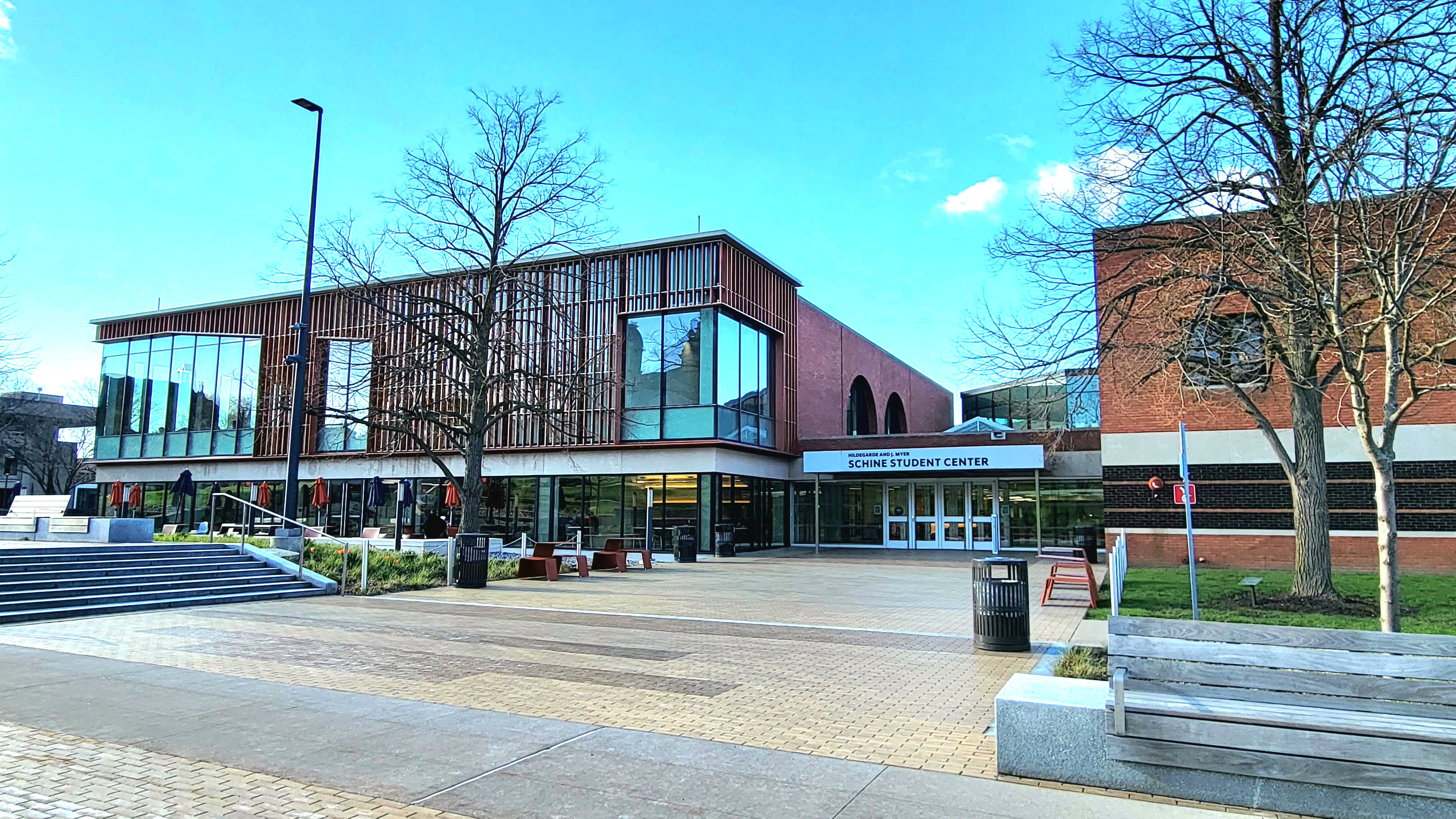
The Schine Student Center

The university's five dining halls, thirteen cafes, and two food courts serve thousands of students every day. In 2022, The Daily Orange reported the per meal cost of the meal plan was $19.59. The Ernie Davis dining hall was built in 2009. It has been recognized for its architecture and named one of the best dining halls in the United States. Syracuse's food program is managed by the university rather than a third-party vendor. In 2022, Food Management reported the university had 6,844 students enrolled in its daily meal plans. In 2014, Food Management reported the university had 8,108 students enrolled in its daily meal plans. Since 2017, the university has received an A+ grade from PETA and been included on the organization's Dean's List of schools in the "vanguard" of vegan cuisine. The Kimmel food court closed in 2021 after the Schine Student Center reopened after renovations.

A student-run chapter of the Food Recovery Network donates about 70 pounds of leftover food each day to food banks. During the fall 2021 semester, the program donated more than 5,000 pounds of food. However, a 2022 Daily Orange report found more than 230 pounds of food still goes to waste each day. In 2010, the dining halls began collecting food waste to be turned into compost with the Onondaga County Resource Recovery Agency. Two student-run food pantries operate on campus, one in Hendricks Chapel and one on South Campus. The pantries are supplemented by a garden that produced 450 pounds of fresh produce in 2020.

Journalist and alumna Avery Yale Kamila reported the dining halls stopped serving veal in 1991, following student protests, and at the time served soy milk, veggie burgers, and vegan casseroles. Alumnus and former basketball player Matt Roe, who played for the Orange in 1986–1989, told The Athletic in 2020 when asked about Syracuse food memories that "Everything on campus was good. Sometimes Shaw Dining Hall was decent."

== Athletics ==
=== Syracuse Orange ===

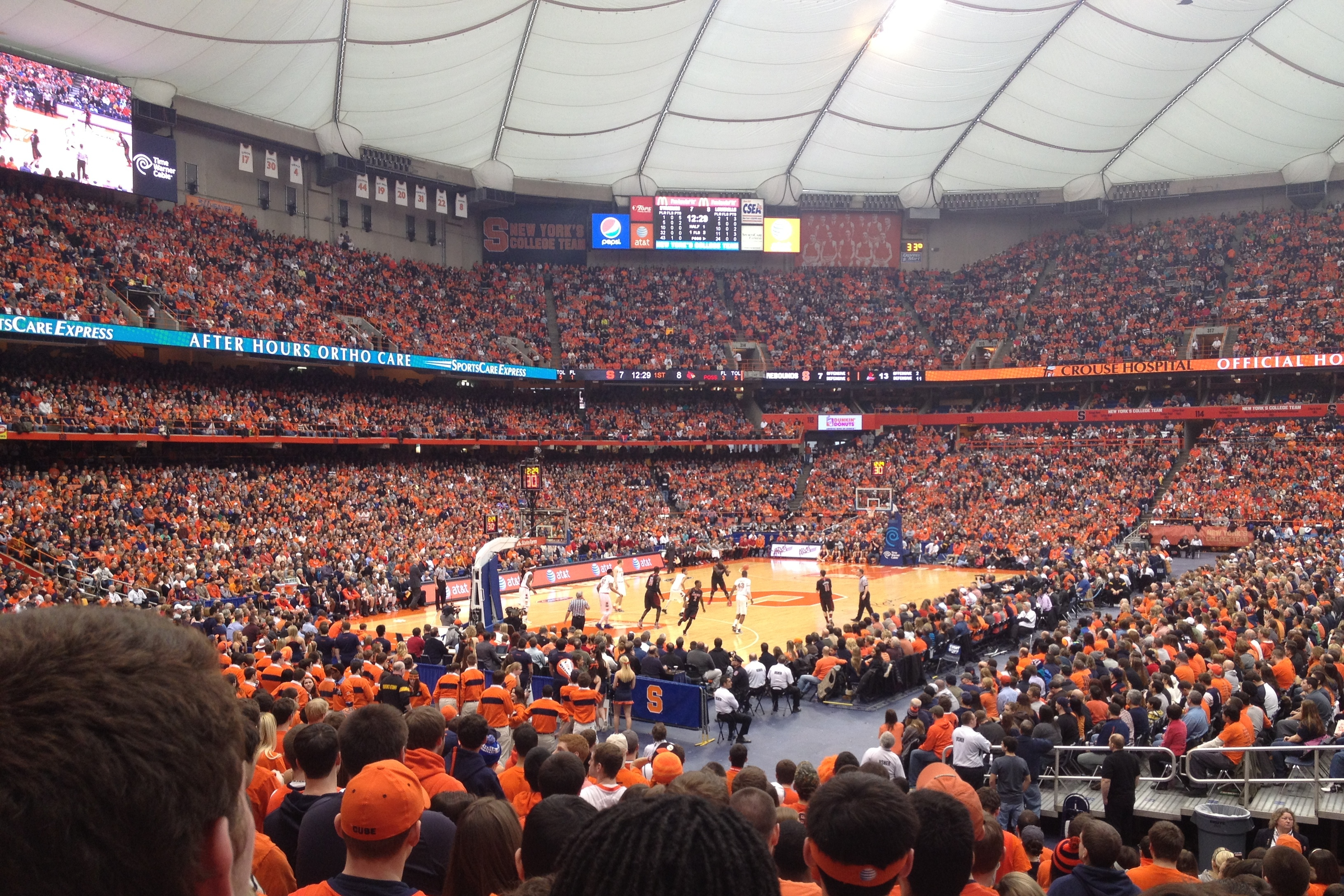
Basketball game in the JMA Dome

Syracuse University's sports teams have had "the Orange" nickname since 2004, although the former names of Orangemen and Orangewomen are still sometimes used. The school's mascot is Otto the Orange. SU fields intercollegiate teams in eight men's sports and 12 women's sports. The men's and women's basketball teams, the football team, and both the men's and women's lacrosse teams play in the JMA Dome, formerly known as the Carrier Dome. Other sports are located at the nearby Manley Field House, except ice hockey which takes place in the Tennity Ice Skating Pavilion. Most of Syracuse University's intercollegiate teams participate in NCAA Division I in the Atlantic Coast Conference since 2013. The Syracuse Orange women's ice hockey team participates in College Hockey America.

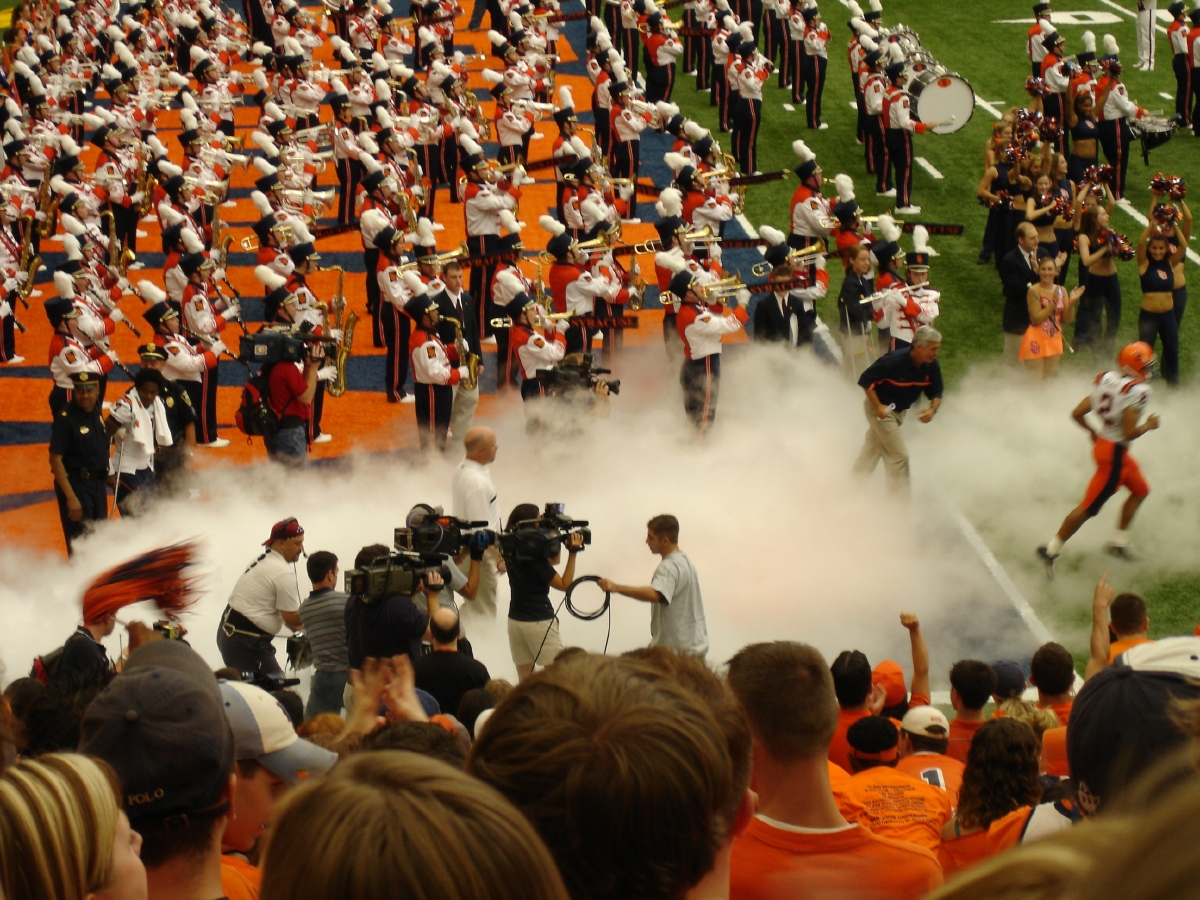
Syracuse football opener in JMA Dome

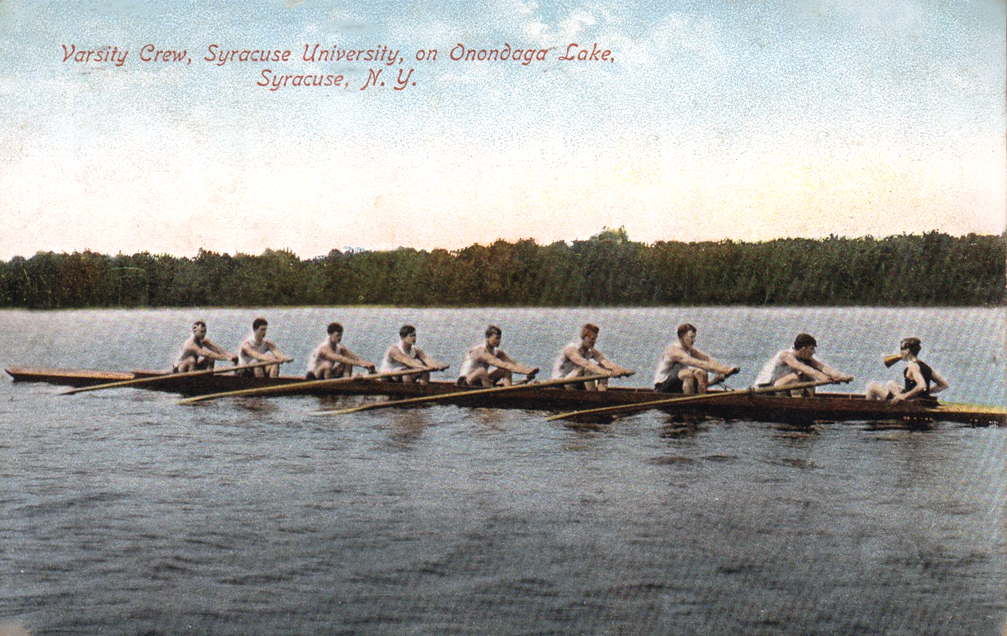
Syracuse University rowing crew, 1910 on Onondaga Lake

SU has reached 31 team national championships, including 14 for men's lacrosse, six for men's rowing, five for women's rowing, two cross country running, and one each in boxing, football, women's lacrosse, and women's field hockey. Syracuse student-athletes in individual sports have won 49 national titles. Under long-time the Hall of Fame head coach Jim Boeheim, men's basketball team won seven Big East regular-season championships, five Big East tournament championships, and 35 NCAA tournament appearances, including the 2003 NCAA championship. The men's basketball team holds the largest on-campus attendance record of 35,642 attendees. The record was set in the JMA Dome playing Duke on Saturday, February 23, 2019.

In 1959, Syracuse earned its first National Championship following an undefeated football season and a Cotton Bowl victory over Texas. The team featured sophomore running back Ernie Davis who, in 1961, became the first African-American to win the Heisman Trophy. Davis was slated to play for the Cleveland Browns in the same backfield as Jim Brown, but died of leukemia before being able to play professionally.

Syracuse played its first intercollegiate lacrosse game in 1916, and captured its first USILA championship in 1920. It won USILA championships in 1922, 1924, and 1925. In the modern NCAA era, Syracuse is the first school to capture 11 National Championships, the most of any team in college lacrosse history. Most recently, Syracuse reached the men's Division I championship game in 2013 after winning two championships in 2008 & 2009 seasons and reaching the quarterfinals in 2011. The women's lacrosse team reached the NCAA Division I National Championship game for the first time in school history in 2012, which they lost to Northwestern.

Syracuse University rowing crew is a full member of the Intercollegiate Rowing Association (IRA). The IRA governs intercollegiate rowing between varsity rowing programs across the United States. Syracuse was added as "full" members of the association briefly after its founding in 1894. Syracuse crew also participates in the Eastern Association of Rowing Colleges. In 1997, the Syracuse Women's Rowing team qualified for the inaugural NCAA Division I Rowing Championship in Rancho Cordova, California, finishing as the 12th ranked crew in the country. The women's rowing team competes in two conferences, both the Atlantic Coast Conference as well as the prestigious Eastern Association of Women's Rowing Colleges, and formerly the Big East Conference.

Syracuse University hosted the 2019 United States Intercollegiate Boxing Association national championship tournament.

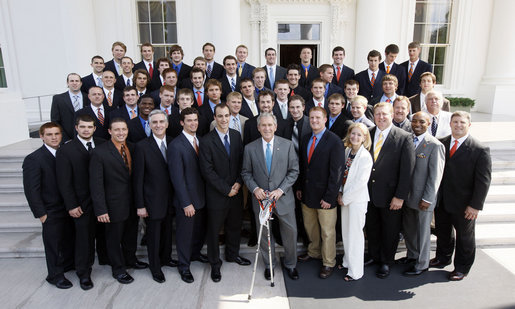
The Syracuse University men's lacrosse team are honored at the White House by President of the United States George W. Bush for winning the 2008 NCAA Division I national championship.

=== JMA Dome ===
Toward the end of the 1970s, Syracuse University was under pressure to improve its football facilities to remain an NCAA Division I football school. Its small concrete stadium, Archbold Stadium, was seventy years old and not up to the standards of other schools. The stadium could not be expanded; it had been reduced from 40,000 seats to 26,000 due to the fire codes. Syracuse University decided to build a new stadium. In 1978, Archbold Stadium was demolished to make way for the Carrier Dome, which was named after Carrier Global Corporation following a $2.75 million gift and would have a domed Teflon-coated, fiberglass inflatable roof. It would also serve as the home for the men's basketball team, as a replacement for Manley Field House. The Carrier Dome was constructed between April 1979 and September 1980.

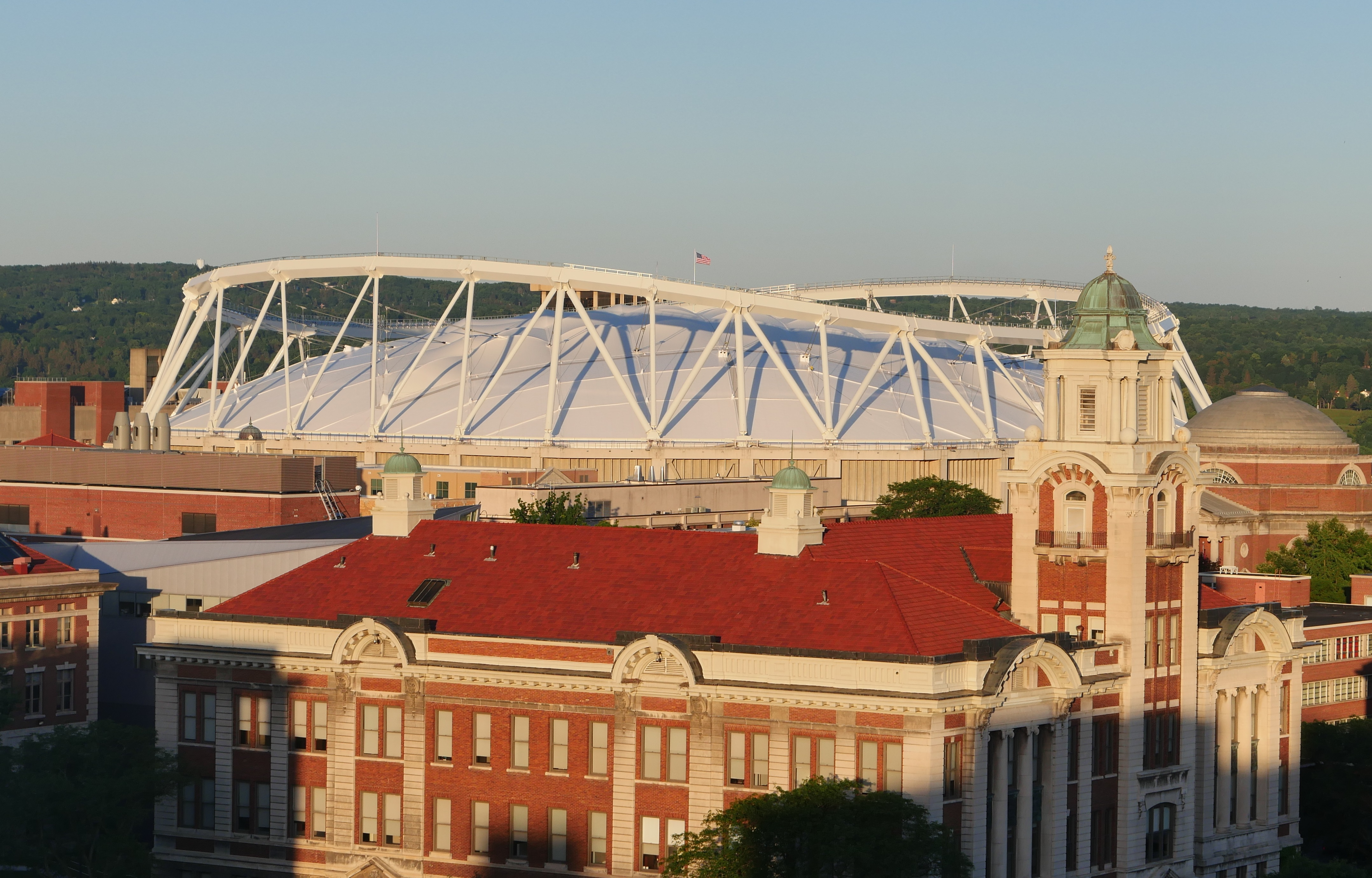
JMA Dome, campus view

In May 2018, the university announced a major renovation to the Carrier Dome as the central portion of a larger campus update. The renovation, estimated to cost $120 million, was completed in 2022. The most significant changes are the replacement of the current air-supported roof with a fixed roof, two-thirds of which will be translucent, the installation of air conditioning and the largest center-hung video board in college sports. The upgrade also included new lighting and sound systems, Wi-Fi improvements, accessibility upgrades, improved restrooms, and new concession spaces. The university announced the next phase of its work towards enhanced stadium experience, which will include complete replacement of benches with individual seats; a construction of an event facility adjacent to the Dome; and an upgrade of the entire wireless infrastructure. This phase two work will begin in spring 2023 following Commencement and will be completed ahead of the 2024 football season.

In May 2022, Syracuse University and JMA Wireless inked a 10-year naming rights deal to rename the Carrier Dome as the JMA Wireless Dome, referred to as the JMA Dome. This is only the second name for the venue since it opened in 1980.

== Alumni ==
Joe Biden, 46th president of the United States

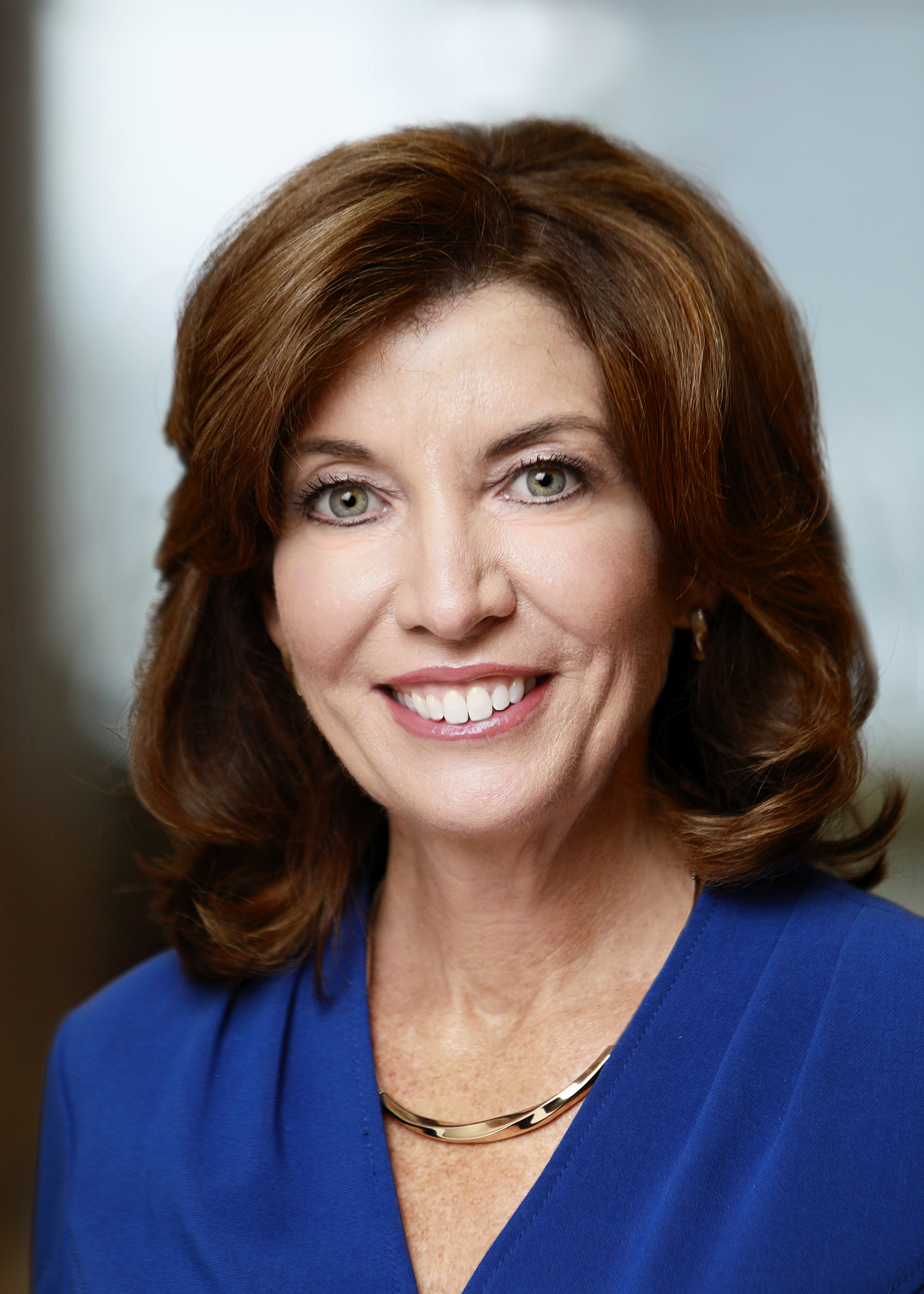
Kathy Hochul, 57th governor of New York

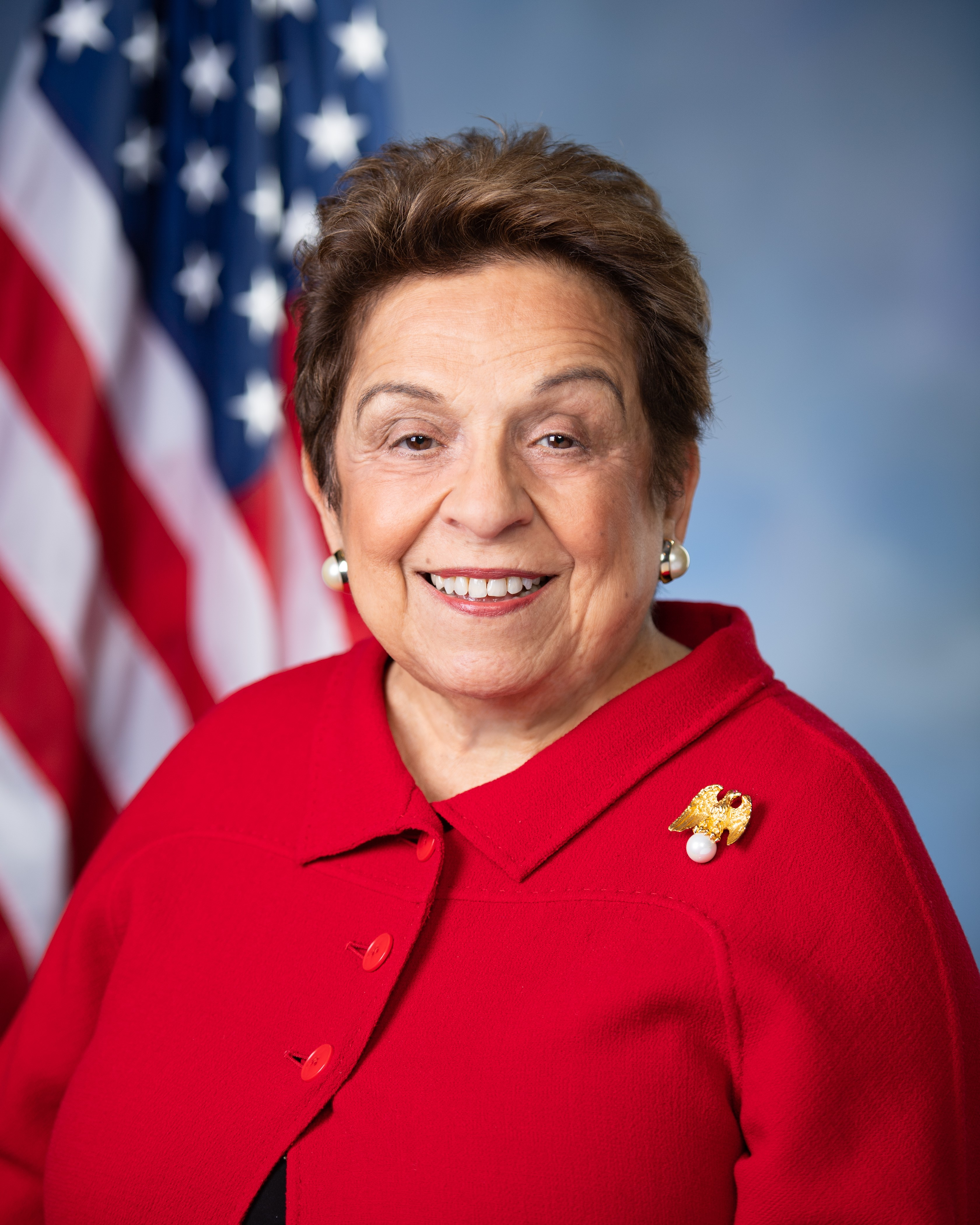
Donna Shalala, politician and academic

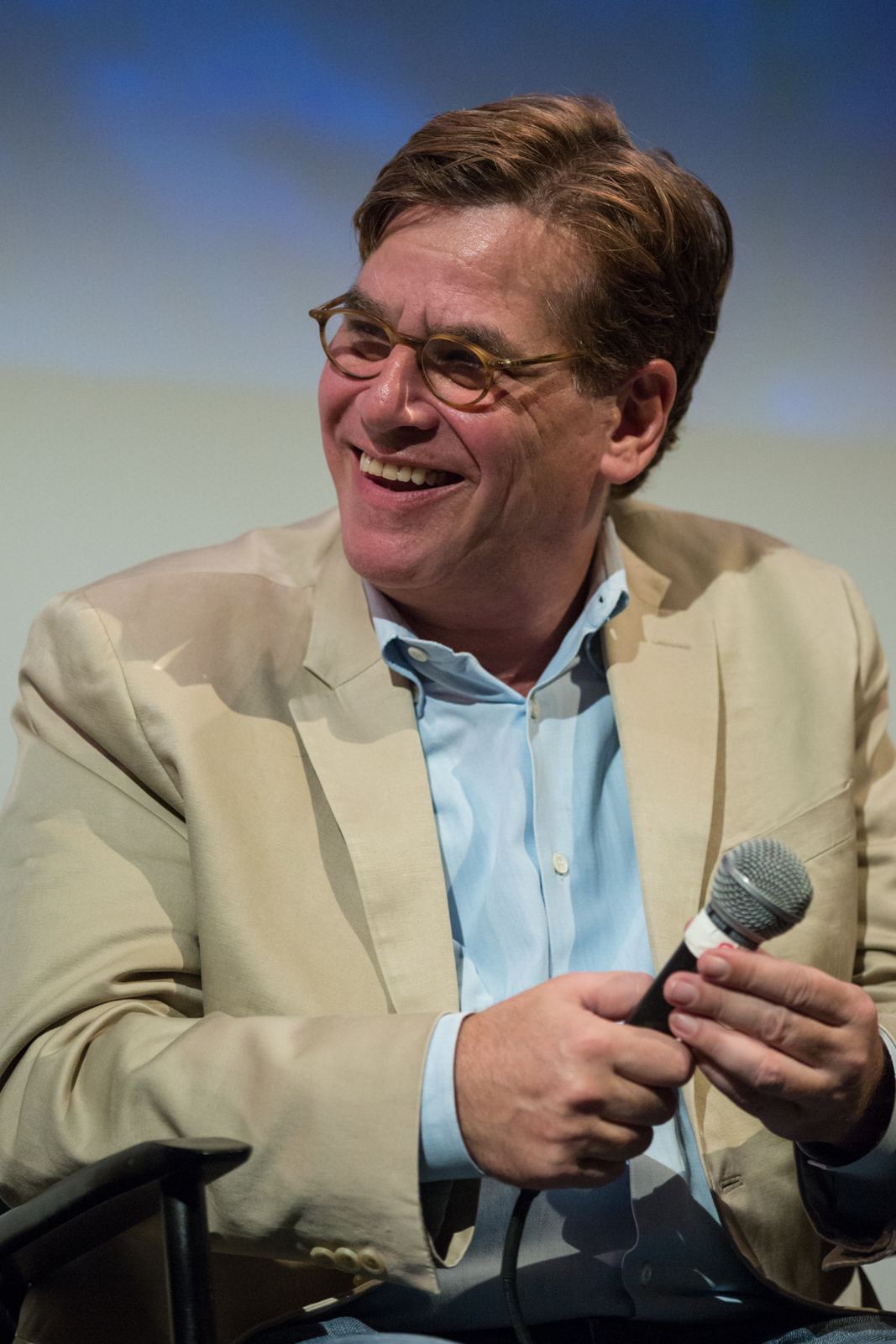
Aaron Sorkin, playwright and screenwriter

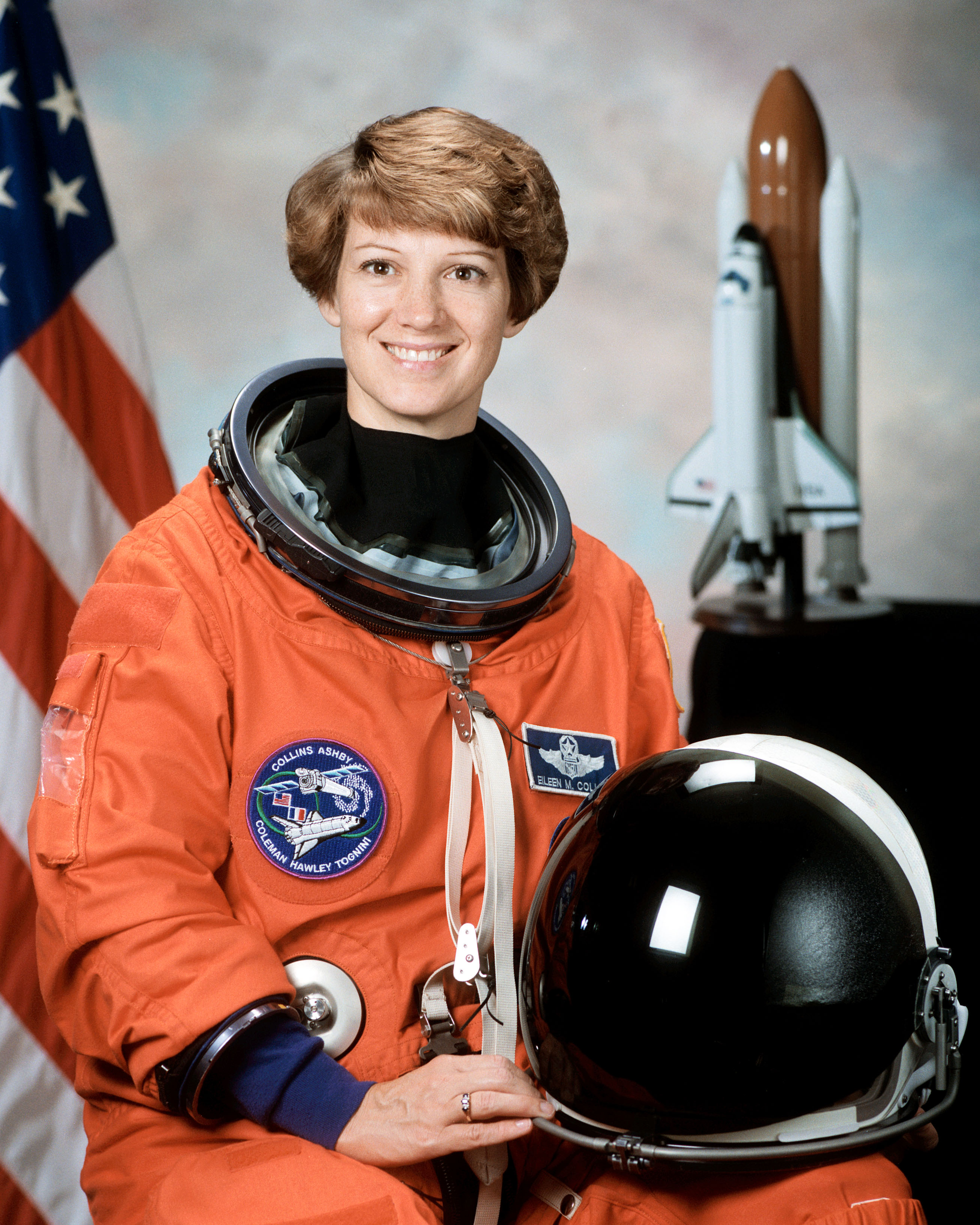
Eileen Collins, first female Space Shuttle pilot and commander

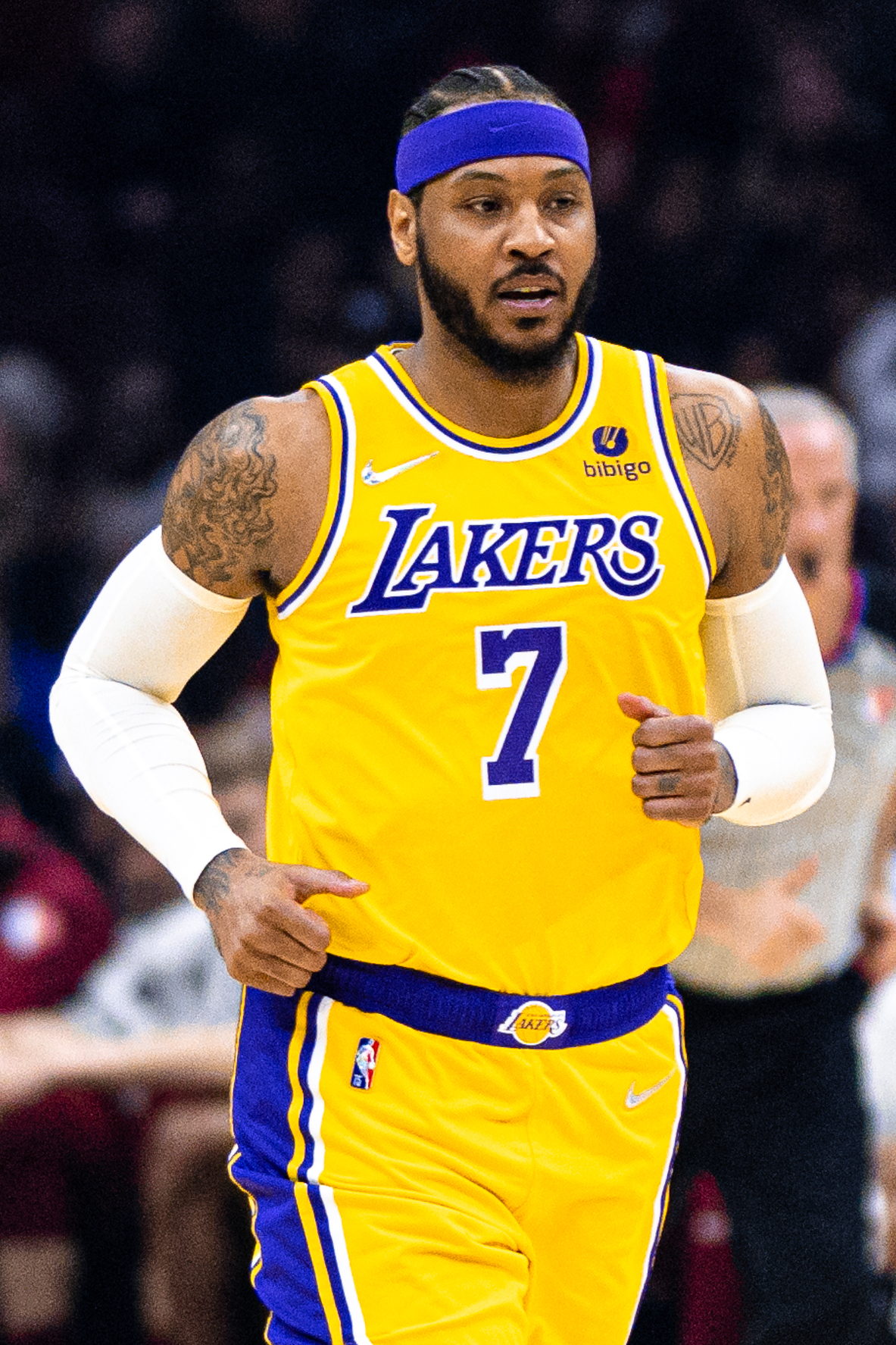
Carmelo Anthony, basketball player

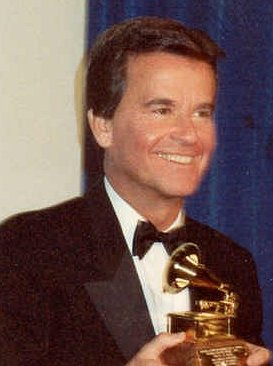
Dick Clark, television host

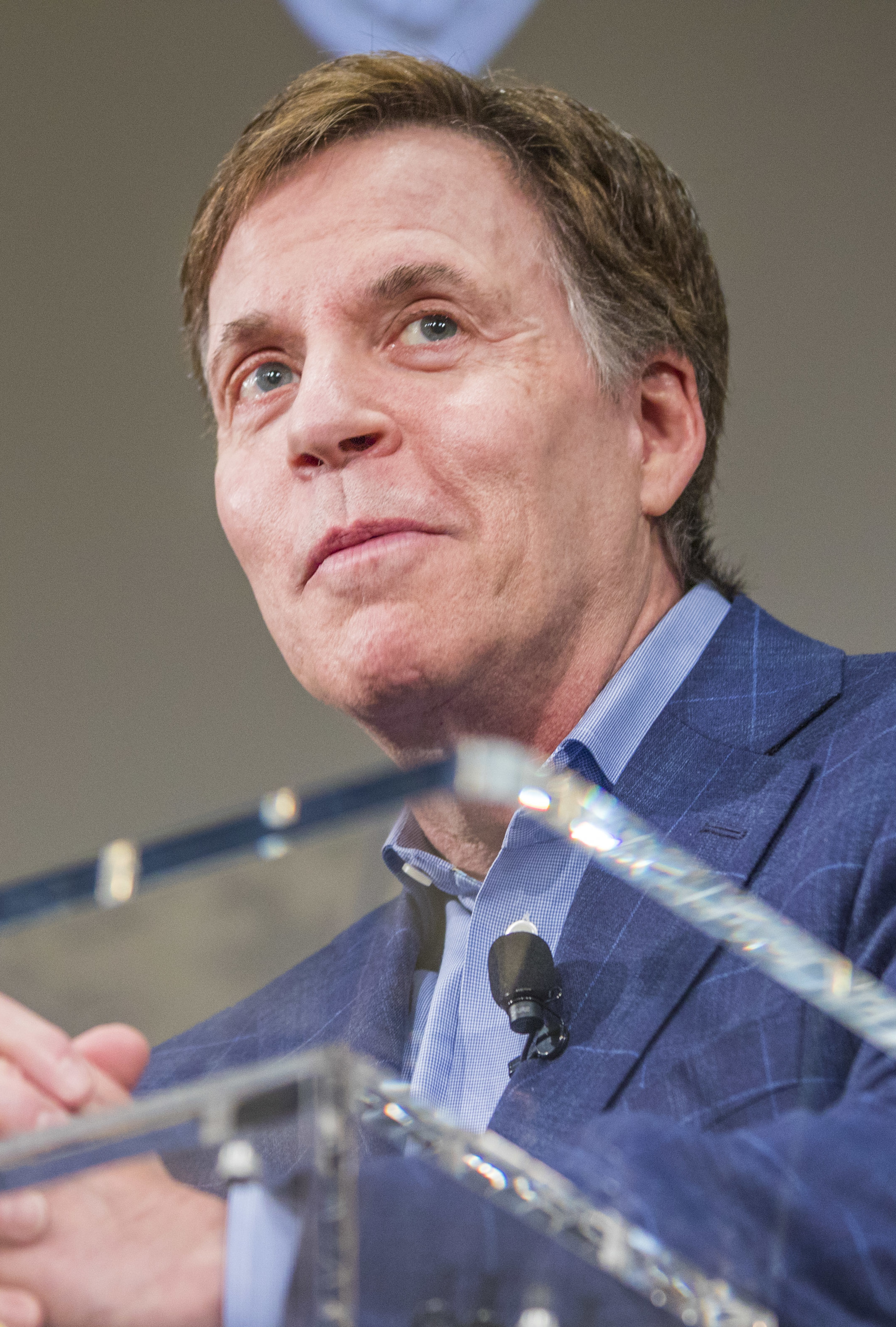
Bob Costas, sportscaster

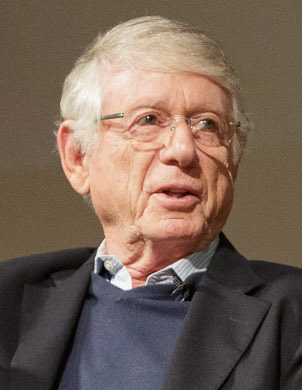
Ted Koppel, broadcast journalist

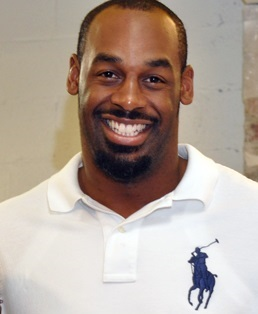
Donovan McNabb, American football player

Syracuse University has over 260,000 alumni representing all 50 states, the District of Columbia, and more than 171 countries and territories. Among the individuals who have attended or graduated from Syracuse University include writers George Saunders, Stephen Crane, Joyce Carol Oates, John D. MacDonald, Cheryl Strayed, Shirley Jackson, Barry N. Malzberg, and Alice Sebold; William Safire, Pulitzer Prize winning commentator; Pierre Ramond, string theorist; Cambridge University historian Sir Moses I. Finley; Sir John Stanley, British Member of Parliament; Salvador del Solar, former prime minister of Peru; Arthur Rock, legendary venture capitalist and cofounder of Intel; Vishal Sikka, Former CEO and MD of Infosys; Donna Shalala, CEO of the Clinton Foundation; Joe Biden, 46th President of the United States; Kathy Hochul, 57th Governor of New York; Robert Jarvik, inventor of the first artificial heart implanted into human beings; Eileen Collins, first female commander of a Space Shuttle; Prince Sultan bin Salman, first Arab, first Muslim and the youngest person to travel to space; Robert Menschel, partner/director at Goldman Sachs; Samuel Irving Newhouse Jr., owner of Conde Nast publications; Lowell Paxson, founder of Home Shopping Network; Betsey Johnson fashion designer; lawyer David P. Weber; and Prince Al-Waleed bin Talal. Emily C. Gorman, former director of the United States Women's Army Corps, completed her graduate studies at Syracuse.

Alumni in journalism and broadcasting include Ted Koppel, Megyn Kelly, Michael Barkann, Bob Costas, Marv Albert, Len Berman, Marc S. Ellenbogen, Marty Glickman, Dorothy Thompson, Beth Mowins, Dave Pasch, Sean McDonough, Ian Eagle, Dave O'Brien, Dick Stockton, Arun Shourie, Mike Tirico, Brian Higgins, Adam Zucker, Lakshmi Singh, Larry Hryb (of Microsoft), Steve Kroft of 60 Minutes, Pulitzer Prize winner Eugene Payne and Adam Schein of Mad Dog Sports Radio, Marc Malusis of WFAN, SNY, and PIX 11, Vietnam war historian and correspondent Bernard Fall, national political columnist Roscoe Drummond, CBS News anchor Jeff Glor, and Nepalese columnist and TV personality Vijay Kumar Pandey.

Notable SU alumni in the performing arts and art include Dick Clark, Taye Diggs, Rob Edwards, Peter Falk, Vera Farmiga, Peter Guber, Peter Hyams, Frank Langella, Jim Morris, Jessie Mueller, Aribert Munzner, Lou Reed, Tom Everett Scott, Aaron Sorkin, Jerry Stiller, Lexington Steele, Bill Viola, Vanessa Williams, Pete Yorn, Susan Sensemann, Clairo, and Hong Kong Cantopop singer Priscilla Chan.

Prominent athletes include Kathrine Switzer, the first woman to officially run the Boston Marathon, Jim Brown, actor and NFL Hall of Famer with the Cleveland Browns; Ernie Davis, the first African-American Heisman Trophy winner; Donovan McNabb, former NFL quarterback; former Indianapolis Colts wide receiver Marvin Harrison; Dwight Freeney, defensive end for the San Diego Chargers; Larry Csonka, former Miami Dolphins running back, Pro Football Hall of Famer and television host, Carmelo Anthony, forward for Syracuse's NCAA men's basketball championship squad and NBA veteran; NBA forward Jerami Grant; 2013–2014 NBA Rookie of the Year Michael Carter-Williams; 7-time NBA All Star, pro basketball Hall of Famer and former Mayor of Detroit Dave Bing; Tim Green, former Atlanta Falcons player, author, lawyer, and National Public Radio commentator; Darryl Johnston, three-time Super Bowl winner with the Dallas Cowboys in the 1990s; Mikey Powell, who formerly played lacrosse for the Boston Cannons; Floyd Little, who played for the Denver Broncos; Kyle Johnson, who played the majority of his NFL career with the Denver Broncos; John Mackey a member of the NFL Hall of Fame played for the Baltimore Colts (1963–71); and Tom Coughlin, former New York Giants head coach and executive VP of football operation at Jacksonville Jaguars.

== Affiliations ==
=== Affiliated institutions ===
==== State University of New York College of Environmental Science and Forestry ====
The College of Environmental Science and Forestry (ESF) has a long affiliation with Syracuse University, shares many campus resources, and operates its main academic campus immediately adjacent to Syracuse University. ESF was founded in 1911 as the New York State College of Forestry at Syracuse University, under the leadership of Syracuse University Trustee Louis Marshall, with the active support of Syracuse University Chancellor Day. Its founding followed the Governor's veto of annual appropriations to a separate New York State College of Forestry at Cornell.

ESF is an autonomous institution, administratively separate from SU, while resources, facilities, and some infrastructure are shared. The two schools share a common Schedule of Classes; students at both institutions may take courses at the other, and degrees from ESF bear the Syracuse University seal along with the State University of New York. A number of concurrent degree programs and certificates are offered between the schools, as well. The college receives an annual appropriation as part of the SUNY budget, and the state builds and maintains all of the college's educational facilities. The state has similar relationships with five statutory colleges that are at Alfred University and Cornell University.

ESF faculty, students, and students' families join those from SU to take part in a joint convocation ceremony at the beginning of the academic year in August and joint commencement exercises in May. ESF and SU students share access to libraries, recreational facilities, student clubs, and other activities at both institutions, except for the schools' intercollegiate sports teams, affiliated with the NCAA and USCAA, respectively. First-year ESF students live in Centennial Hall on ESF's campus.

==== State University of New York Upstate Medical University ====
The medical school was formerly a college within SU, known as the Syracuse University Medical School. In 1950, SU sold the medical school to the State University of New York system. The campuses of the two universities are adjacent to each other on University Hill in Syracuse. The universities jointly offer a Master of Public Health, a PhD program in biomedical engineering, and M.D./MBA degree program.

=== Formerly affiliated institutions ===
==== State University of New York at Binghamton ====
Binghamton University was established in 1946 as Triple Cities College, to serve the needs of local veterans of the Binghamton, New York area, who were returning from World War II. Established in Endicott, New York, the college was a branch of Syracuse University. Triple Cities College offered local students the first two years of their education, while the following two were spent at Syracuse University. In 1946, students could earn their degrees entirely at the Binghamton campus. In 1950, it was absorbed by the State University of New York and renamed Harpur College.

==== Utica University ====
Utica University, an independent private university located in Utica, New York, was founded by Syracuse University in 1946. Utica University became independent from Syracuse in 1995 but still offers its students the option to receive a specialized bachelor's degree from Syracuse University through a mutual relationship between the two schools.

== See also ==
- Feiner v. New York
- Say Yes to Education
- Syracuse University Alma Mater
- Syracuse University in pop culture
