= Jim Crow laws =

Laws enforcing racial segregation in the U.S.

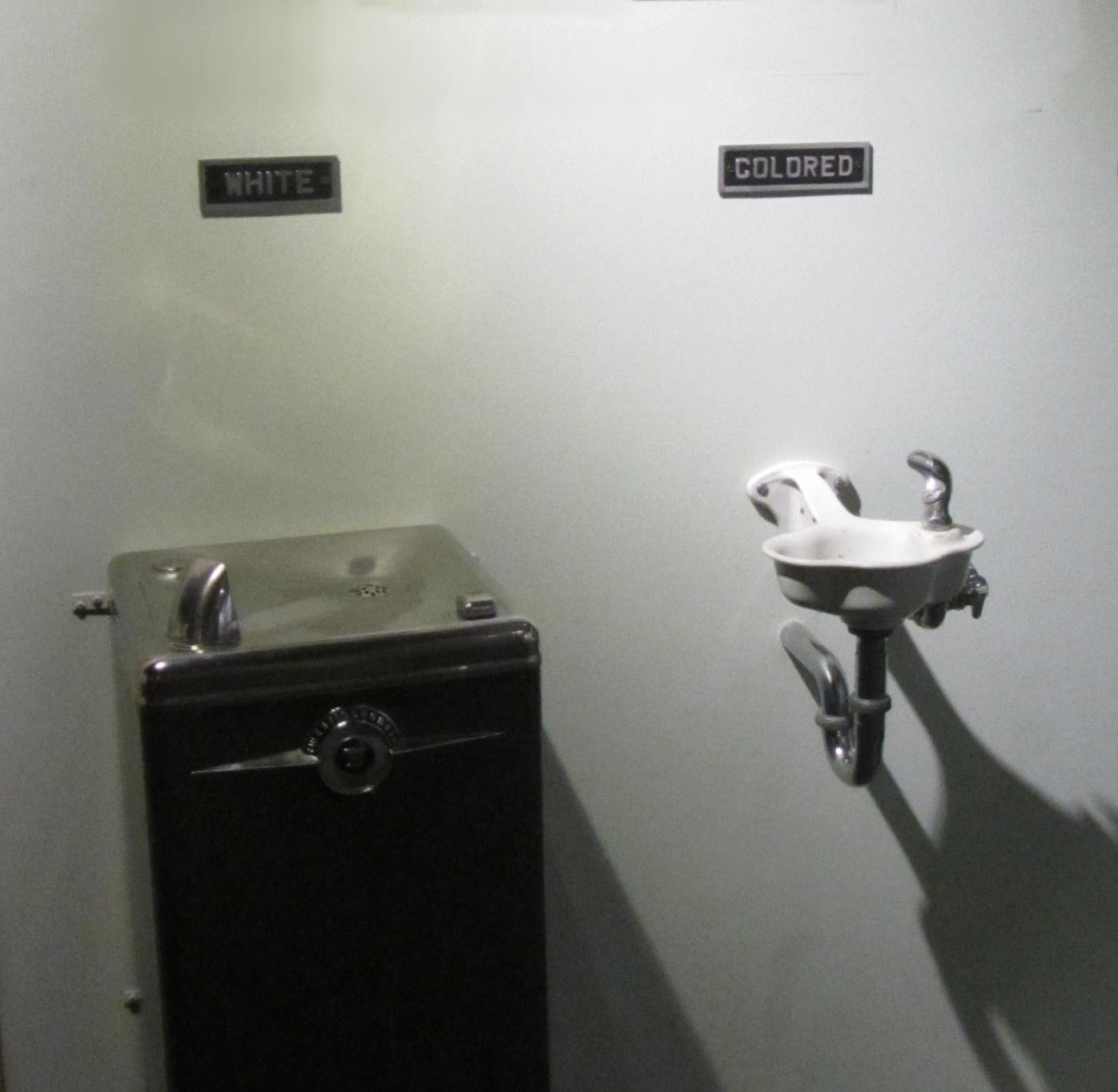
Segregated water fountains for whites and "colored" people

The Jim Crow laws were state and local laws introduced in the Southern United States from the late 19th century to the mid-20th century that enforced racial segregation. The origin of the term Jim Crow is obscure, but probably refers to a minstrel show song called "Jump Jim Crow". Formal and informal racial segregation policies were present in other areas of the United States as well, even as several states outside the South had banned discrimination in public accommodations and voting. Southern laws were enacted by white-dominated state legislatures (Redeemers) to disenfranchise and remove political and economic gains made by African Americans during the Reconstruction era. Such continuing racial segregation was also supported by the successful Lily-white movement.

In practice, Jim Crow laws mandated racial segregation in all public facilities in the South, beginning in the 1870s. Jim Crow laws were upheld in 1896 in the case of Plessy v. Ferguson, in which the Supreme Court laid out its "separate but equal" legal doctrine concerning facilities for African Americans. Public education had essentially been segregated since it began during the Reconstruction era after 1863. Companion laws excluded most African Americans from the vote in the South.

Although in theory the "equal" segregation doctrine governed public facilities and transportation, facilities for African Americans were consistently inferior and underfunded compared to facilities for white Americans; sometimes, there were no facilities for black people at all. Far from equality, as a body of law, Jim Crow institutionalized economic, educational, political and social disadvantages and second-class citizenship for most African Americans living in the United States. After the National Association for the Advancement of Colored People (NAACP) was founded in 1909, it became involved in a sustained public protest and various campaigns against the Jim Crow laws and the so-called "separate but equal" doctrine.

In 1954, segregation of public schools (state-sponsored) was declared unconstitutional by the U.S. Supreme Court in the landmark case Brown v. Board of Education of Topeka. In some states, it took many years to implement this decision, while the Warren Court continued to rule against Jim Crow legislation in other cases such as Heart of Atlanta Motel, Inc. v. United States (1964). Most remaining Jim Crow laws were overturned by the Civil Rights Act of 1964 and the Voting Rights Act of 1965, and Southern states' anti-miscegenation laws were overturned in the 1967 case of Loving v. Virginia.

== Etymology ==
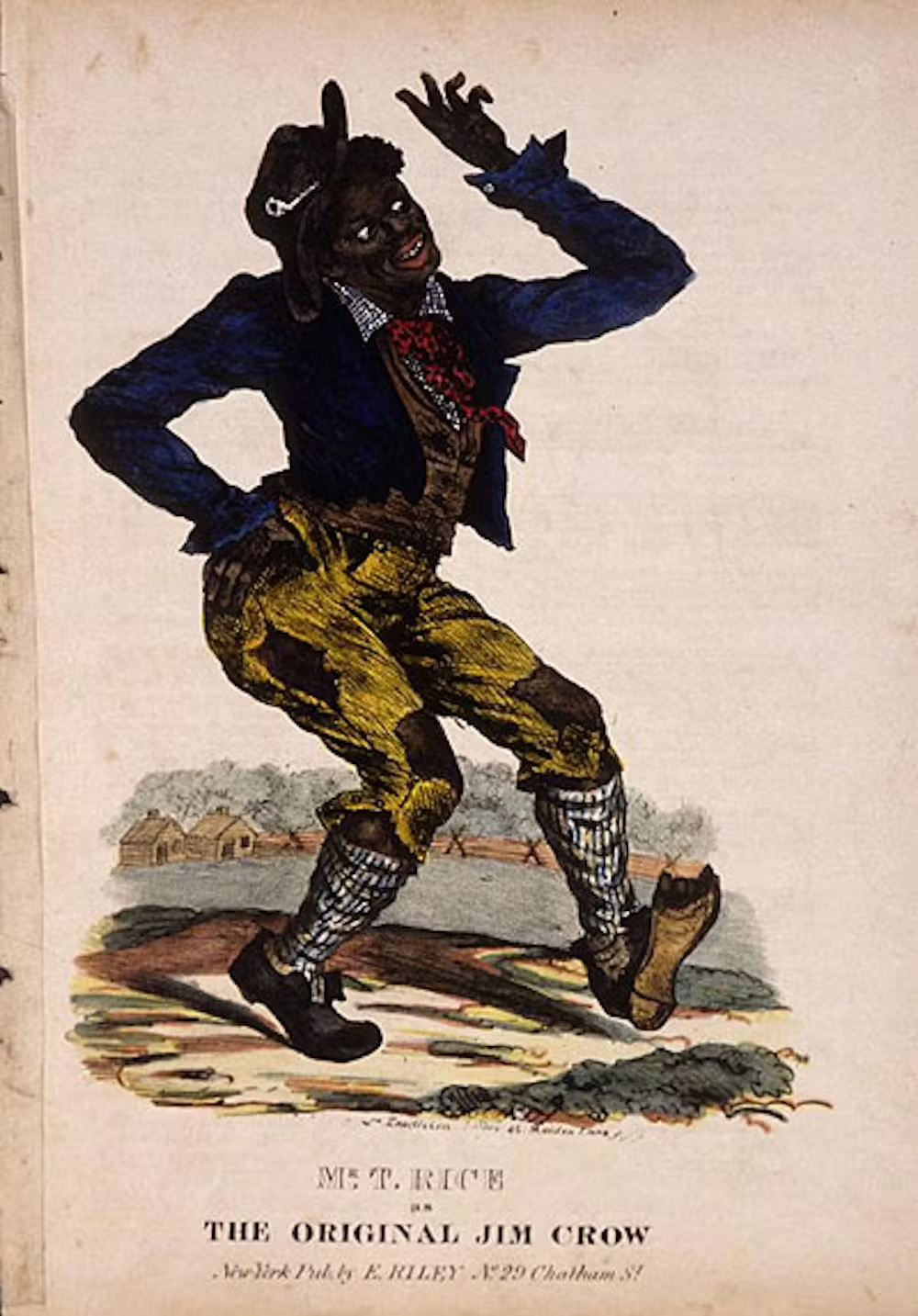
Blackface of Thomas D. Rice to play the role of Jim Crow, a character that caricatures African Americans in a racist manner, c. 1832 illustration

The origin of the term "Jim Crow" is obscure, but probably refers to slave singing that incorporated an African dance called "Jump Jim Crow". "Jump Jim Crow" became a minstrel show dance performed by white actor Thomas D. Rice in blackface, first performed in 1828. Many other white minstrel dancers in blackface copied it for white audiences. According to The Jim Crow Encyclopedia:

The routine was immensely popular during the antebellum period, and the figure of Jim Crow became a recognizable and enduring icon in American popular culture. In the 1840s, abolitionists used the phrase Jim Crow to describe segregated railroad cars. By the end of the 19th century, the term came to signify the social separation of the races.

The earliest known use of the phrase "Jim Crow law" can be dated to 1884 in a newspaper article summarizing congressional debate. The term appears in 1892, in the title of a New York Times article about Louisiana requiring segregated railroad cars.

== Origins ==
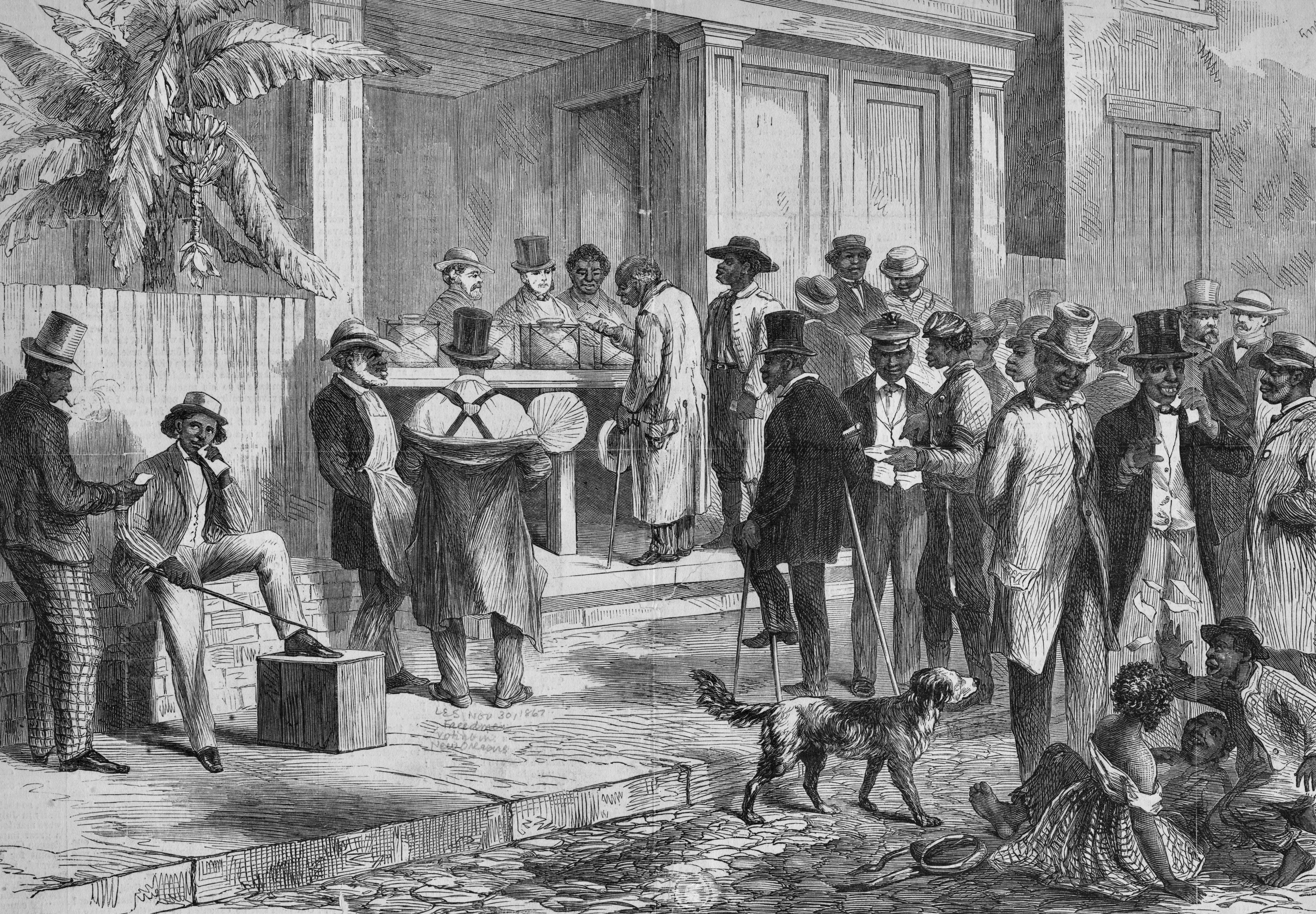
Freedmen voting in New Orleans in 1867

In January 1865, an amendment to the Constitution abolishing slavery in the United States was proposed by Congress and ratified as the Thirteenth Amendment on December 18, 1865. During the Reconstruction era of 1865–1877, federal laws provided civil rights protections in the U.S. South for freedmen, African Americans who were former slaves, and the minority of black people who had been free before the war. In the 1870s, Democrats gradually regained power in the Southern legislatures as violent insurgent paramilitary groups, such as the Ku Klux Klan, White League, and Red Shirts disrupted Republican organizing, ran Republican officeholders out of town, and lynched black voters as an intimidation tactic to suppress the black vote. Extensive voter fraud was also used. In one instance, an outright coup or insurrection in coastal North Carolina led to the violent removal of democratically elected Republican party executive and representative officials, who were either hunted down or hounded out. Gubernatorial elections were close and had been disputed in Louisiana for years, with increasing violence against black Americans during campaigns from 1868 onward.

The Compromise of 1877 to gain Southern support in the presidential election resulted in the government withdrawing the last of the federal troops from the South. White Democrats had regained political power in every Southern state. These Southern, white, "Redeemer" governments legislated Jim Crow laws, officially segregating the country's population. Jim Crow laws were a manifestation of authoritarian rule specifically directed at one racial group.

Black people were still elected to local offices throughout the 1880s in local areas with large black populations, but their voting was suppressed for state and national elections. States passed laws to make voter registration and electoral rules more restrictive, with the result that political participation by most black people and many poor white people began to decrease. Between 1890 and 1910, ten of the eleven former Confederate states, beginning with Mississippi, passed new constitutions or amendments that effectively disenfranchised most black people and tens of thousands of poor white people through a combination of poll taxes, literacy and comprehension tests, and residency and record-keeping requirements. Grandfather clauses temporarily permitted some illiterate white people to vote but gave no relief to most black people.

Voter turnout dropped dramatically through the South as a result of these measures. In Louisiana, by 1900, black voters were reduced to 5,320 on the rolls, although they comprised the majority of the state's population. By 1910, only 730 black people were registered, less than 0.5% of eligible black men. "In 27 of the state's 60 parishes, not a single black voter was registered any longer; in 9 more parishes, only one black voter was." The cumulative effect in North Carolina meant that black voters were eliminated from voter rolls during the period from 1896 to 1904. The growth of their thriving middle class was slowed. In North Carolina and other Southern states, black people suffered from being made invisible in the political system: "[W]ithin a decade of disfranchisement, the white supremacy campaign had erased the image of the black middle class from the minds of white North Carolinians." In Alabama, tens of thousands of poor whites were also disenfranchised, although initially legislators had promised them they would not be affected adversely by the new restrictions.

Those who could not vote were not eligible to serve on juries and could not run for local offices. They effectively disappeared from political life, as they could not influence the state legislatures, and their interests were overlooked. While public schools had been established by Reconstruction legislatures for the first time in most Southern states, those for black children were consistently underfunded compared to schools for white children, even when considered within the strained finances of the postwar South where the decreasing price of cotton kept the agricultural economy at a low.

Like schools, public libraries for black people were underfunded, if they existed at all, and they were often stocked with secondhand books and other resources. These facilities were not introduced for African Americans in the South until the first decade of the 20th century. Throughout the Jim Crow era, libraries were only available sporadically. Prior to the 20th century, most libraries established for African Americans were school-library combinations. Many public libraries for both European-American and African-American patrons in this period were founded as the result of middle-class activism aided by matching grants from the Carnegie Foundation.

In some cases, progressive measures intended to reduce election fraud, such as the Eight Box Law in South Carolina, acted against black and white voters who were illiterate, as they could not follow the directions. While the separation of African Americans from the white general population was becoming legalized and formalized during the Progressive Era (1890s–1920s), it was also becoming customary. Even in cases in which Jim Crow laws did not expressly forbid black people from participating in sports or recreation, a segregated culture had become common.

In the Jim Crow context, the presidential election of 1912 was steeply slanted against the interests of African Americans. Most black Americans still lived in the South, where they had been effectively disfranchised, so they could not vote at all. While poll taxes and literacy requirements banned many poor or illiterate people from voting, these stipulations frequently had loopholes that exempted European Americans from meeting the requirements. In Oklahoma, for instance, anyone qualified to vote before 1866, or related to someone qualified to vote before 1866 (a kind of "grandfather clause"), was exempted from the literacy requirement; but the only men who had the franchise before that year were white or European-American. European Americans were effectively exempted from the literacy testing, whereas black Americans were effectively singled out by the law.

Woodrow Wilson was a Democrat elected from New Jersey, but he was born and raised in the South, and was the first Southern-born president of the post-Civil War period. He appointed Southerners to his Cabinet. Some quickly began to press for segregated workplaces, although the city of Washington, D.C., and federal offices had been integrated since after the Civil War. In 1913, Secretary of the Treasury William Gibbs McAdoo – an appointee of the President – was heard to express his opinion of black and white women working together in one government office: "I feel sure that this must go against the grain of the white women. Is there any reason why the white women should not have only white women working across from them on the machines?"

The Wilson administration introduced segregation in federal offices, despite much protest from African-American leaders and white progressive groups in the north and midwest. He appointed segregationist Southern politicians because of his own firm belief that racial segregation was in the best interest of black and European Americans alike. At the Great Reunion of 1913 at Gettysburg, Wilson addressed the crowd on July 4, the semi-centennial of Abraham Lincoln's declaration that "all men are created equal":

How complete the union has become and how dear to all of us, how unquestioned, how benign and majestic, as state after state has been added to this, our great family of free men!

In sharp contrast to Wilson, a Washington Bee editorial wondered if the "reunion" of 1913 was a reunion of those who fought for "the extinction of slavery" or a reunion of those who fought to "perpetuate slavery and who are now employing every artifice and argument known to deceit" to present emancipation as a failed venture. Historian David W. Blight observed that the "Peace Jubilee" at which Wilson presided at Gettysburg in 1913 "was a Jim Crow reunion, and white supremacy might be said to have been the silent, invisible master of ceremonies".

In Texas, several towns adopted residential segregation laws between 1910 and the 1920s. Legal strictures called for segregated water fountains and restrooms. The exclusion of African Americans also found support in the Republican Lily-white movement.

== Historical development ==
=== Early attempts to break Jim Crow ===
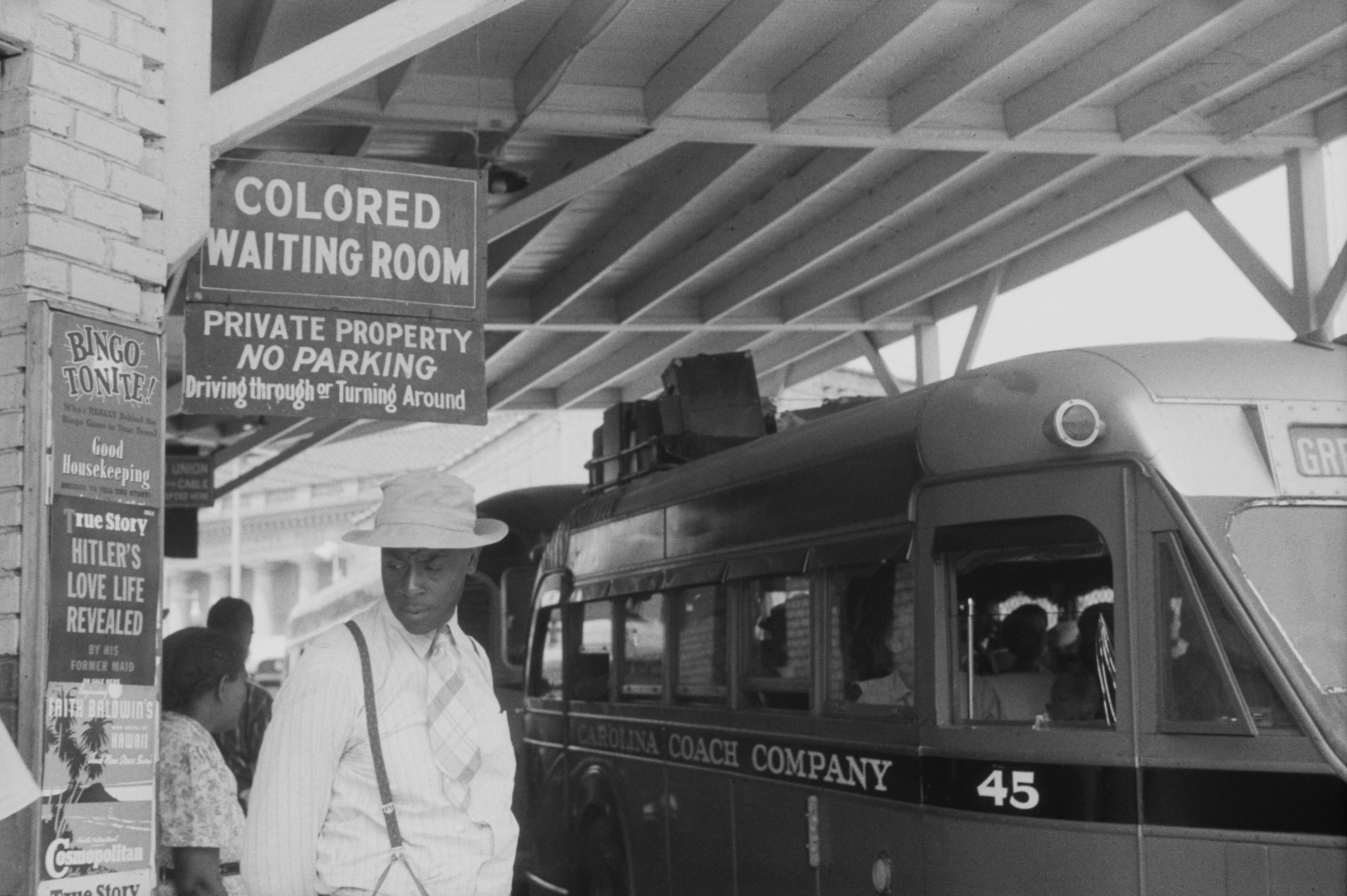
Sign for the "colored" waiting room at a bus station in Durham, North Carolina, May 1940

The Civil Rights Act of 1875, introduced by Charles Sumner and Benjamin Butler, stipulated a guarantee that everyone, regardless of race, color, or previous condition of servitude, was entitled to the same treatment in public accommodations, such as inns, public transportation, theaters, and other places of recreation. This Act had little effect in practice. An 1883 Supreme Court decision ruled that the act was unconstitutional in some respects, saying Congress was not afforded control over private persons or corporations. With white southern Democrats forming a solid voting bloc in Congress, due to having outsize power from keeping seats apportioned for the total population in the South (although hundreds of thousands had been disenfranchised), Congress did not pass another civil rights law until 1957.

In 1887, Rev. William Henry Heard lodged a complaint with the Interstate Commerce Commission against the Georgia Railroad and Banking Company for discrimination, citing its provision of different cars for white and black/colored passengers. The company successfully appealed for relief on the grounds it offered "separate but equal" accommodation.

In 1890, Louisiana passed a law requiring separate accommodations for colored and white passengers on railroads. Louisiana law distinguished between "white", "black" and "colored" (that is, mixed creoles of color). The law had already specified that black people could not ride with white people, but colored people could ride with white people before 1890. A group of concerned black, colored and white citizens in New Orleans formed an association dedicated to rescinding the law. The group persuaded Homer Plessy to test it; he was a man of color who was of fair complexion and one-eighth "Negro" in ancestry.

In 1892, Plessy bought a first-class ticket from New Orleans on the East Louisiana Railway. Once he had boarded the train, he informed the train conductor of his racial lineage and took a seat in the whites-only car. He was directed to leave that car and sit instead in the "coloreds only" car. Plessy refused and was immediately arrested. The Citizens Committee of New Orleans fought the case all the way to the United States Supreme Court. They lost in Plessy v. Ferguson (1896), in which the Court ruled that "separate but equal" facilities were constitutional. The finding contributed to 58 more years of legalized discrimination against black and colored people in the United States.

In 1908, Congress defeated an attempt to introduce segregated streetcars into the capital.

=== Racism in the United States and defenses of Jim Crow ===
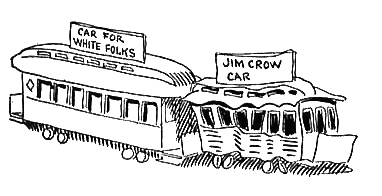
1904 caricature of "White" and "Jim Crow" rail cars by John T. McCutcheon. Despite Jim Crow's legal pretense that the races be "separate but equal" under the law, non-whites were given inferior facilities and treatment.

White Southerners encountered problems in learning free labor management after the end of slavery, and they resented African Americans, who represented the Confederacy's Civil War defeat: "With white supremacy being challenged throughout the South, many whites sought to protect their former status by threatening African Americans who exercised their new rights." White Southerners used their power to segregate public spaces and facilities in law and reestablish social dominance over black people in the South.

One rationale for the systematic exclusion of African Americans from southern public society was that it was for their own protection. An early 20th-century scholar suggested that allowing black people to attend white schools would mean "constantly subjecting them to adverse feeling and opinion", which might lead to "a morbid race consciousness". This perspective took anti-black sentiment for granted, because bigotry was widespread in the South after slavery became a racial caste system.

Justifications for white supremacy were provided by scientific racism and negative stereotypes of African Americans. Social segregation, from housing to laws against interracial chess games, was justified as a way to prevent black men from having sex with white women and in particular the rapacious Black Buck stereotype.

=== World War II and post-war era ===
In 1944, Associate justice Frank Murphy introduced the word "racism" into the lexicon of U.S. Supreme Court opinions in Korematsu v. United States, 323 U.S. 214 (1944). In his dissenting opinion, Murphy stated that by upholding the forced relocation of Japanese Americans during World War II, the Court was sinking into "the ugly abyss of racism". This was the first time that "racism" was used in Supreme Court opinion (Murphy used it twice in a concurring opinion in Steele v Louisville & Nashville Railway Co 323 192 (1944) issued that day). Murphy used the word in five separate opinions, but after he left the court, "racism" was not used again in an opinion for two decades. It next appeared in the landmark decision of Loving v. Virginia, 388 U.S. 1 (1967).

Educational segregation in the US prior to Brown v. Board of Education. All the states of the "South" or with the longest histories of slavery (in red) segregated schools by law statewide.

Numerous boycotts and demonstrations against segregation had occurred throughout the 1930s and 1940s. The National Association for the Advancement of Colored People (NAACP) had been engaged in a series of litigation cases since the early 20th century in efforts to combat laws that disenfranchised black voters across the South. Some of the early demonstrations achieved positive results, strengthening political activism, especially in the post-World War II years. Black veterans were impatient with social oppression after having fought for the United States and freedom across the world. In 1947 K. Leroy Irvis of Pittsburgh's Urban League, for instance, led a demonstration against employment discrimination by the city's department stores. It was the beginning of his own influential political career.

After World War II, people of color increasingly challenged segregation, as they believed they had more than earned the right to be treated as full citizens because of their military service and sacrifices. The civil rights movement was energized by a number of flashpoints, including the 1946 police beating and blinding of World War II veteran Isaac Woodard while he was in U.S. Army uniform. In 1948 President Harry S. Truman issued Executive Order 9981, ending racial discrimination in the armed services. That same year, Silas Herbert Hunt enrolled in the University of Arkansas, effectively starting the desegregation of education in the South.

As the civil rights movement gained momentum and used federal courts to attack Jim Crow statutes, the white-dominated governments of many of the southern states countered by passing alternative forms of resistance.

== Decline and removal ==
Historian William Chafe has explored the defensive techniques developed inside the African American community to avoid the worst features of Jim Crow as expressed in the legal system, unbalanced economic power, and intimidation and psychological pressure. Chafe described a common strategy deployed by the community in order to accommodate white-imposed sanctions while subtly encouraging challenges to those sanctions. Chafe described 'walking the tightrope' as "using compliance with prescribed behaviors and gestures to make possible a different kind of result—a result consistent with advancement, collectively and individually."

Chafe argued that the places essential for change to begin were institutions, particularly black churches, which functioned as centers for community-building and discussion of politics. Additionally, some all-black communities, such as Mound Bayou, Mississippi, and Ruthville, Virginia, served as sources of pride and inspiration for black society as a whole. Over time, pushback and open defiance of the oppressive existing laws grew, until it reached a boiling point in the aggressive, large-scale activism of the 1950s civil rights movement.

=== Brown v. Board of Education ===
The NAACP Legal Defense Committee (a group that became independent of the NAACP) – and its lawyer, Thurgood Marshall – brought the landmark case Brown v. Board of Education of Topeka, 347 U.S. 483 (1954) before the U.S. Supreme Court under Chief Justice Earl Warren. In its pivotal 1954 decision, the Warren Court unanimously (9–0) overturned the 1896 Plessy decision. The Supreme Court found that legally mandated (de jure) public school segregation was unconstitutional. The decision had far-reaching social ramifications.

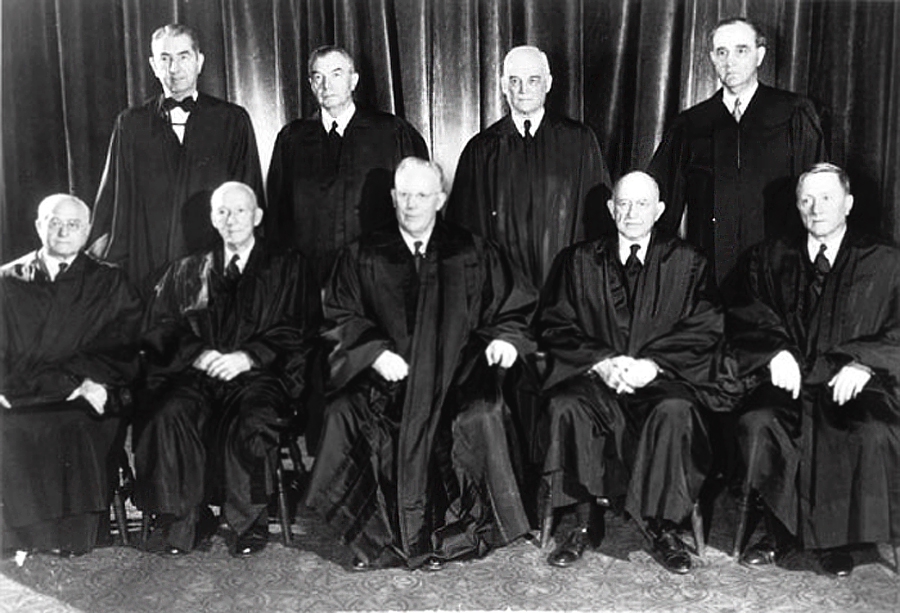
In the landmark case Brown v. Board of Education (1954), the U.S. Supreme Court under Chief Justice Earl Warren ruled unanimously that public school segregation was unconstitutional.

Children saying the pledge of allegiance at Gwynns Falls Elementary School, Maryland, 1 year after Brown v. Board of Education.

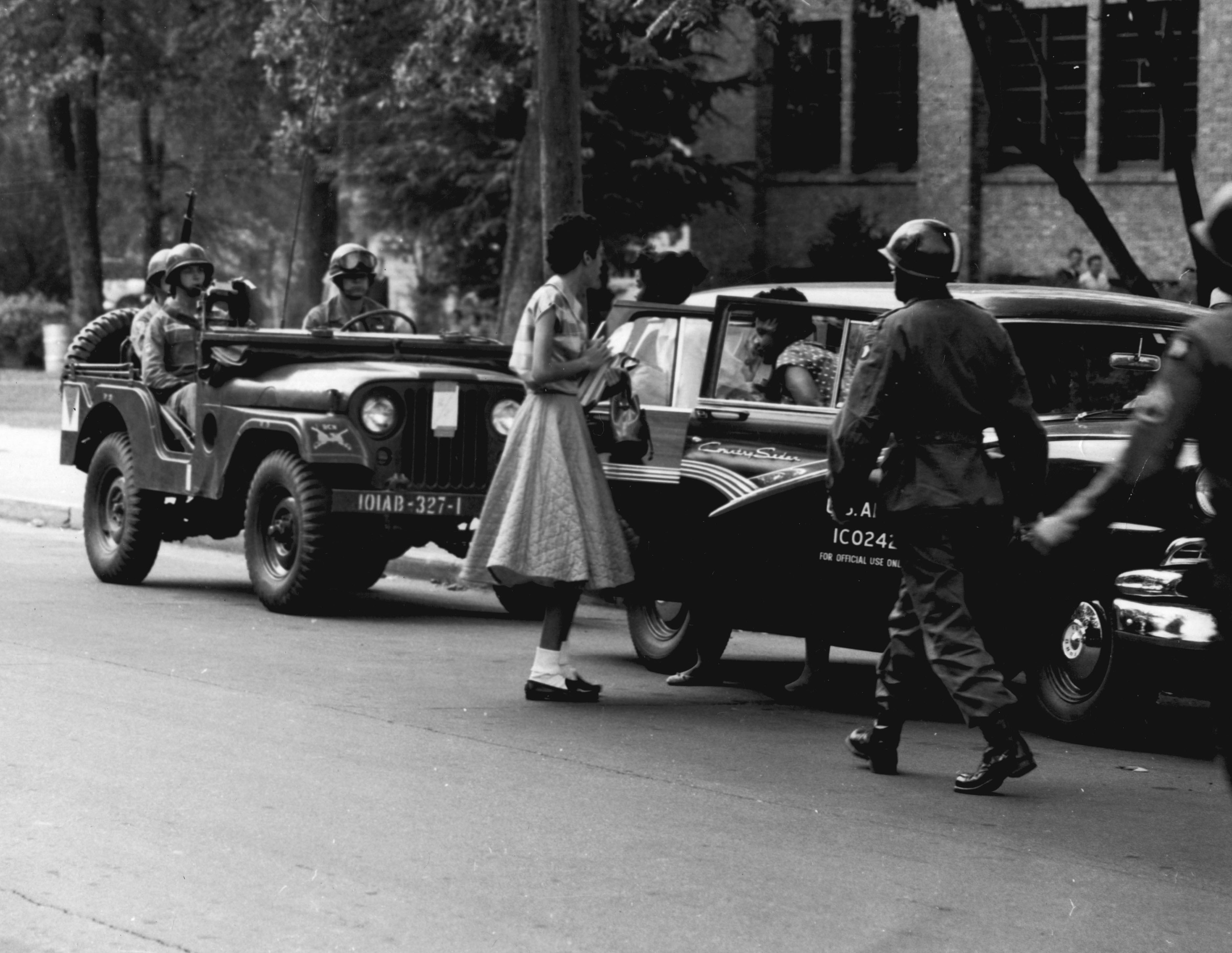
Soldiers from the 101st Airborne Division protect the nine African-American students to Central High School in Little Rock in Sept. 1957, after the governor of Arkansas tried to enforce segregation.

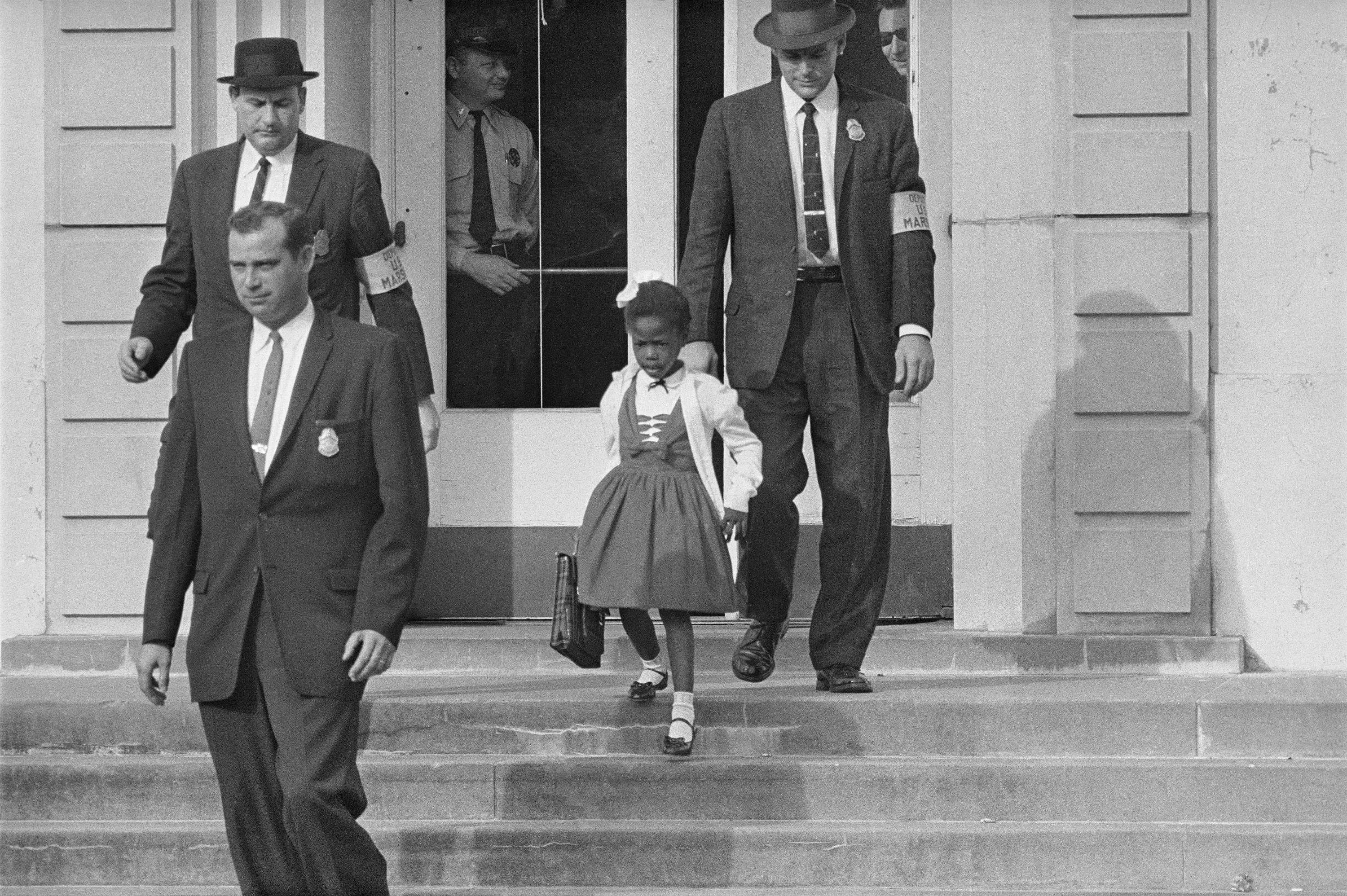
US Marshals escorting young Ruby Bridges on school steps, 1960

=== Integrating collegiate sports ===
Racial integration of all-white collegiate sports teams was high on the Southern agenda in the 1950s and 1960s. Involved were issues of equality, racism, and the alumni demand for the top players needed to win high-profile games. The Atlantic Coast Conference (ACC) of flagship state universities in the Southeast took the lead. First they started to schedule integrated teams from the North. Finally, ACC schools – typically under pressure from boosters and civil rights groups – integrated their teams. With an alumni base that dominated local and state politics, society and business, the ACC schools were successful in their endeavor – as Pamela Grundy argues, they had learned how to win:

The widespread admiration that athletic ability inspired would help transform athletic fields from grounds of symbolic play to forces for social change, places where a wide range of citizens could publicly and at times effectively challenge the assumptions that cast them as unworthy of full participation in U.S. society. While athletic successes would not rid society of prejudice or stereotype – black athletes would continue to confront racial slurs [...] [minority star players demonstrated] the discipline, intelligence, and poise to contend for position or influence in every arena of national life.

=== Public arena ===
In 1955, Rosa Parks refused to give up her seat on a city bus to a white man in Montgomery, Alabama. This was not the first time this happened – for example, Parks was inspired by 15-year-old Claudette Colvin taking the same action nine months earlier – but the Parks act of civil disobedience was chosen, symbolically, as an important catalyst in the growth of the post-1954 civil rights movement; activists built the Montgomery bus boycott around it, which lasted more than a year and resulted in desegregation of the privately run buses in the city. Civil rights protests and actions, together with legal challenges, resulted in a series of legislative and court decisions which contributed to undermining the Jim Crow system.

=== End of legal segregation ===
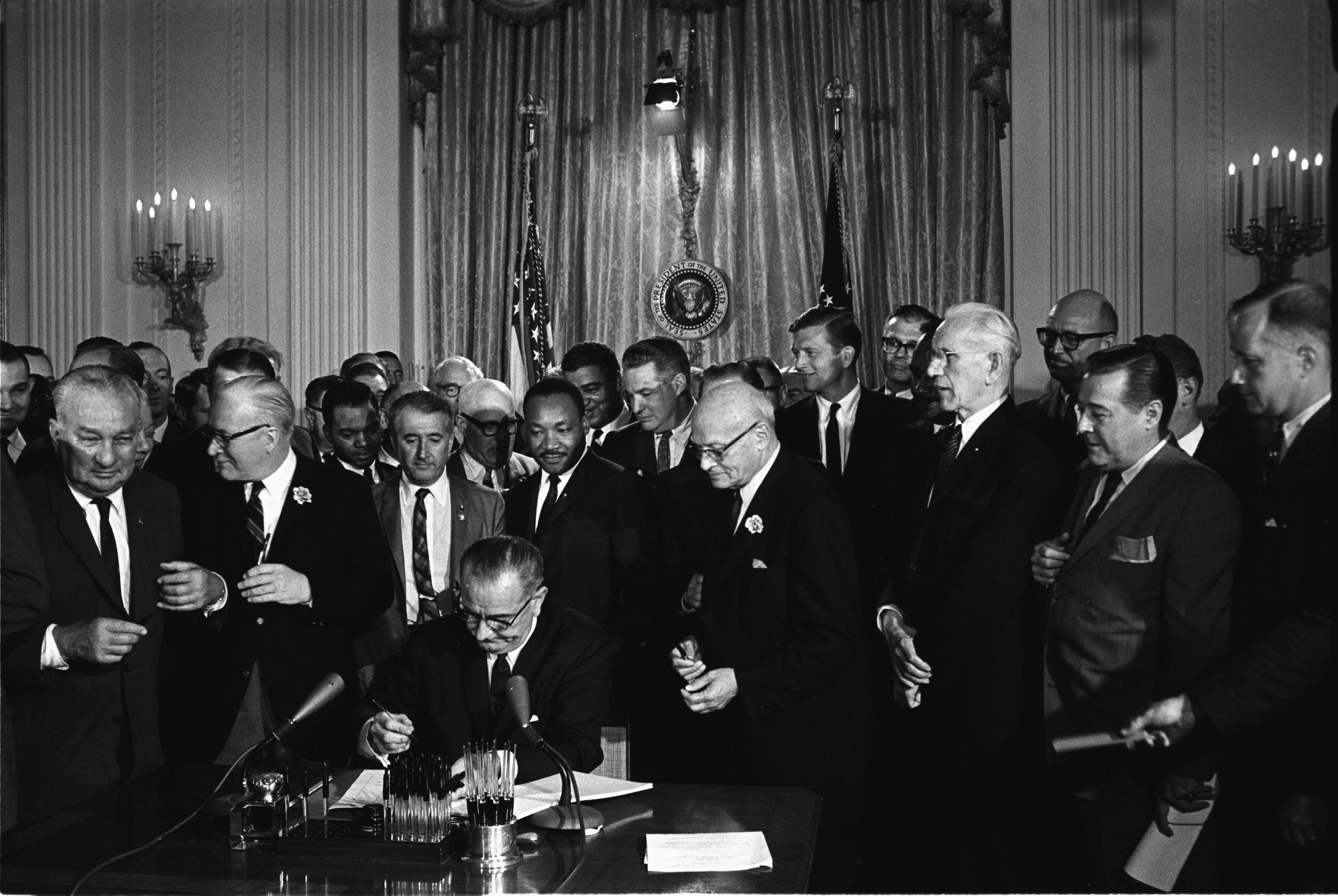
President Lyndon B. Johnson signs the Civil Rights Act of 1964.

The decisive action ending segregation came when Congress in bipartisan fashion overcame Southern filibusters to pass the Civil Rights Act of 1964 and the Voting Rights Act of 1965. A complex interaction of factors came together unexpectedly in the period 1954–1965 to make the momentous changes possible. The Supreme Court had taken the first initiative in Brown v. Board of Education (1954), declaring segregation of public schools unconstitutional. Enforcement was rapid in the North and border states, but was deliberately stopped in the South by the movement called Massive Resistance, sponsored by rural segregationists who largely controlled the state legislatures. Southern liberals, who counseled moderation, were shouted down by both sides and had limited impact. Much more significant was the civil rights movement, especially the Southern Christian Leadership Conference (SCLC) headed by Martin Luther King Jr. It largely displaced the old, much more moderate NAACP in taking leadership roles. King organized massive demonstrations, that seized massive media attention in an era when network television news was an innovative and universally watched phenomenon.

Civil rights demonstration at the segregated public beach of Fort Lauderdale, Florida, July 1961

SCLC, student activists and smaller local organizations staged demonstrations across the South. National attention focused on Birmingham, Alabama, where protesters (mostly young teenagers), faced off against Commissioner of Public Safety Bull Connor, Connor arrested 900 on one day alone. The next day Connor unleashed billy clubs, police dogs, and high-pressure water hoses to disperse and punish the young demonstrators with a brutality that horrified the nation. The brutality undermined the image of a modernizing progressive urban South. President John F. Kennedy, who had been calling for moderation, threatened to use federal troops to restore order in Birmingham. The result in Birmingham was compromise by which the new mayor opened the library, golf courses, and other city facilities to both races, against the backdrop of church bombings and assassinations.

In summer 1963, there were 800 demonstrations in 200 southern cities and towns, with over 100,000 participants, and 15,000 arrests. In Alabama in June 1963, Governor George Wallace escalated the crisis by defying court orders to admit the first two black students to the University of Alabama. Kennedy responded by sending Congress a comprehensive civil rights bill, and ordered Attorney General Robert F. Kennedy to file federal lawsuits against segregated schools, and to deny funds for discriminatory programs. Martin Luther King launched a huge march on Washington in August 1963, bringing out 200,000 demonstrators in front of the Lincoln Memorial, at the time the largest political assembly in the nation's history. The Kennedy administration now gave full-fledged support to the civil rights movement, but powerful southern congressmen blocked any legislation.

After Kennedy was assassinated, President Lyndon B. Johnson called for immediate passage of Kennedy's civil rights legislation as a memorial to the martyred president. Johnson formed a coalition with Northern Republicans that led to passage in the House, and with the help of Republican Senate leader Everett Dirksen with passage in the Senate early in 1964. For the first time in history, the southern filibuster was broken and the Senate finally passed its version on June 19 by vote of 73 to 27.

The Civil Rights Act of 1964 was the most powerful affirmation of equal rights ever made by Congress. It guaranteed access to public accommodations such as restaurants and places of amusement, authorized the Justice Department to bring suits to desegregate facilities in schools, gave new powers to the Civil Rights Commission; and allowed federal funds to be cut off in cases of discrimination. Furthermore, racial, religious and gender discrimination was outlawed for businesses with 25 or more employees, as well as apartment houses. The South resisted until the last moment, but as soon as the new law was signed by President Johnson on July 2, 1964, it was widely accepted across the nation. There was only a scattering of diehard opposition, typified by restaurant owner Lester Maddox in Georgia.

In January 1964, President Johnson met with civil rights leaders. On January 8, during his first State of the Union address, Johnson asked Congress to "let this session of Congress be known as the session which did more for civil rights than the last hundred sessions combined." On June 21, three civil rights workers – Michael Schwerner, Andrew Goodman, and James Chaney – disappeared in Neshoba County, Mississippi, where they were volunteering in the registration of African American voters as part of the Freedom Summer project. The disappearance of the three activists captured national attention and the ensuing outrage was used by Johnson and civil rights activists to build a coalition of northern and western Democrats and Republicans and push Congress to pass the Civil Rights Act of 1964.

On July 2, 1964, Johnson signed the historic Civil Rights Act of 1964. It invoked the Commerce Clause to outlaw discrimination in public accommodations (privately owned restaurants, hotels, and stores, and in private schools and workplaces). This use of the Commerce Clause was upheld by the Warren Court in the landmark case Heart of Atlanta Motel v. United States 379 US 241 (1964).

By 1965, efforts to break the grip of state disenfranchisement by education for voter registration in southern counties had been underway for some time, but had achieved only modest success overall. In some areas of the Deep South, white resistance made these efforts almost entirely ineffectual. The murder of the three voting-rights activists in Mississippi in 1964 and the state's refusal to prosecute the murderers, along with numerous other acts of violence and terrorism against black people, had gained national attention. Finally, the unprovoked attack on March 7, 1965, by county and state troopers on peaceful Alabama marchers crossing the Edmund Pettus Bridge en route from Selma to the state capital of Montgomery, persuaded the President and Congress to overcome Southern legislators' resistance to effective voting rights enforcement legislation. President Johnson issued a call for a strong voting rights law and hearings soon began on the bill that would become the Voting Rights Act.

The Voting Rights Act of 1965 ended legally sanctioned state barriers to voting for all federal, state and local elections. It also provided for federal oversight and monitoring of counties with historically low minority voter turnout. Years of enforcement have been needed to overcome resistance, and additional legal challenges have been made in the courts to ensure the ability of voters to elect candidates of their choice. For instance, many cities and counties introduced at-large election of council members, which resulted in many cases of diluting minority votes and preventing election of minority-supported candidates. After passage of the act, Martin Luther King Jr. began to turn his attentions to a fledgling Poor People's Campaign. His ill-fated proposal for an Economic Bills of Rights was met with hostility from southern Democrats as well as northern and southern Republicans in Congress.

== Influence and aftermath ==
=== African American life ===
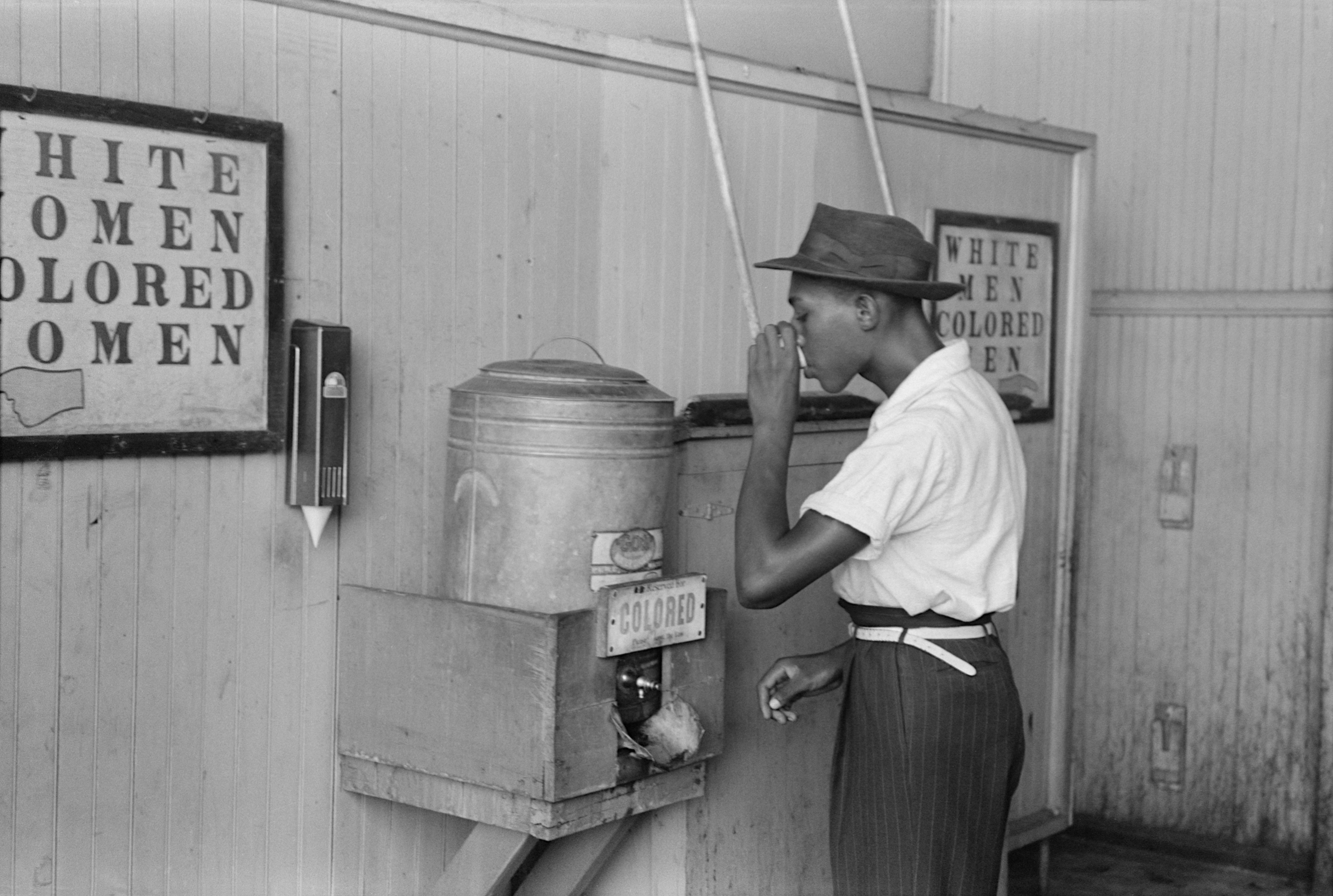
An African American man drinking at a "colored" drinking fountain in a streetcar terminal in Oklahoma City, Oklahoma, 1939

The Jim Crow laws were factors that led to the Great Migration during the first half of the 20th century. Because job opportunities were very limited in the rural South, African Americans moved in great numbers to cities in Northeastern, Midwestern, and Western states to seek better lives.

African American athletes faced much discrimination during the Jim Crow era with white opposition leading to their exclusion from most organized sporting competitions.

The boxers Jack Johnson and Joe Louis (both of whom became world heavyweight boxing champions) and track and field athlete Jesse Owens (who won four gold medals at the 1936 Summer Olympics in Berlin) gained prominence during the era. In baseball, a color line instituted in the 1880s had informally barred black people from playing in the major leagues, leading to the development of the Negro leagues, which featured many famous players. A major breakthrough occurred in 1947, when Jackie Robinson was hired as the first African American to play in Major League Baseball; he permanently broke the color bar. Baseball teams continued to integrate in the following years, leading to the full participation of black baseball players in the Major Leagues in the 1960s.

=== Interracial marriage ===
Although sometimes counted among Jim Crow laws of the South, statutes such as anti-miscegenation laws were also passed by other states. Anti-miscegenation laws were not repealed by the Civil Rights Act of 1964, but were declared unconstitutional by the U.S. Supreme Court (the Warren Court) in a unanimous ruling Loving v. Virginia (1967). Chief Justice Earl Warren wrote in the court opinion that "the freedom to marry, or not marry, a person of another race resides with the individual, and cannot be infringed by the State."

=== Jury trials ===
The Sixth Amendment to the United States Constitution grants criminal defendants the right to a trial by a jury of their peers. While federal law required that convictions could only be granted by a unanimous jury for federal crimes, states were free to set their own jury requirements. All but two states, Oregon and Louisiana, opted for unanimous juries for conviction. Oregon and Louisiana, however, allowed juries of at least 10–2 to decide a criminal conviction. Louisiana's law was amended in 2018 to require a unanimous jury for criminal convictions, effective in 2019. Prior to that amendment, the law had been seen as a remnant of Jim Crow laws, because it allowed minority voices on a jury to be marginalized. In 2020, the Supreme Court found, in Ramos v. Louisiana, that unanimous jury votes are required for criminal convictions at state levels, thereby nullifying Oregon's remaining law, and overturning previous cases in Louisiana.

=== Later court cases ===
In 1971, the U.S. Supreme Court (the Burger Court), in Swann v. Charlotte-Mecklenburg Board of Education, upheld desegregation busing of students to achieve integration.

The Voting Rights Act has been substantially weakened by the Roberts Court. In Shelby County v. Holder (2013), the Court removed the federal preclearance requirement for any Southern state alteration in voting policies. In Louisiana v. Callais (2026), the Court ruled that the interpretation of section 2 as requiring the creation of majority-minority districts was unconstitutional, and that plaintiffs must prove a state intentionally redistricted based on race. In her dissent, Justice Elena Kagan wrote that Louisiana v. Callais "renders Section 2 all but a dead letter".

=== Felony disenfranchisement ===
Mississippi Today discusses the present-day Jim Crow legacy of felony disenfranchisement, and states that part of Mississippi's 1890 constitution was not erased by the Civil Rights Movement during the 1960s. The article states the constitutional felony disenfranchisement clause "takes away – for life – the right to vote upon conviction for several low-level crimes, like theft and bribery, that the 1890 drafters felt would be mostly committed by Black people."

=== International ===
In 2017, Ford Foundation Professor of Law James Whitman contended that, during sessions culminating in the Nuremberg Laws, Nazi officials such as Franz Gürtner and Bernhard Lösener discussed a memorandum by Heinrich Krieger, a former graduate student at the University of Arkansas. Krieger had published an article on "Principles of Indian [Native American] law" (1935) in the Washington Law Review, focusing on the Dawes Act and Indian Reorganization Act. The memorandum, based on research into the history of United States immigration and Jim Crow laws, became the basis for Krieger's Race Law in the United States (1936). Scholars such as Michael Livingston, while lauding Whitman's analysis of the memorandum and his comparisons between U.S. and German state-sponsored eugenics legislation, demanded more evaluation and evidence for any additional contentions. In 2023, Darren Walker, president of the Ford Foundation endowment for Whitman's chair, opined that "Henry Ford, our founder, was among the twentieth century's most virulent American antisemites. And yet, to me, our past confers a special obligation to engage, not to retreat – no matter the complications or the consequences."

== Remembrance ==
Ferris State University in Big Rapids, Michigan, houses the Jim Crow Museum of Racist Memorabilia, an extensive collection of everyday items that promoted racial segregation or presented racial stereotypes of African Americans, for the purpose of academic research and education about their cultural influence.

== See also ==
- Anti-miscegenation laws
- Apartheid
- Black Codes in the United States
- Casta
- Convict leasing
- Disenfranchisement after the Reconstruction era
- Group Areas Act
- Indian Act
- Israeli apartheid
- Jim Crow economy
- Juan Crow
- List of Jim Crow law examples by state
- Lynching
- Mass racial violence in the United States
- Native Lands Act 1865
- Natives Land Act, 1913
- Pass law
- Racial segregation in the United States
- Racism in the United States
- Second-class citizen
- Sharecropping
- Sundown town
- The New Jim Crow
- Timeline of the civil rights movement
- White Australia policy
