= Barbara Whitman =

American theatrical producer

- Education: New York University (BA); Columbia University (MFA)
- Occupation: Broadway producer
- Father: Martin J. Whitman
- Relatives: James Whitman (brother)
- Awards: Tony Award for Best Musical (2022)

Barbara Whitman is an American theatrical producer. She won a Tony Award for Best Musical for producing A Strange Loop (2022).

== Biography ==
Whitman is the daughter of investment advisor Martin J. Whitman, namesake of the Martin J. Whitman School of Management at Syracuse University. She has two brothers: James Whitman, a professor at Yale Law School, and Thomas Whitman, a professor of music at Swarthmore College. Her aunt is judge Phyllis W. Beck, who served on the Superior Court of Pennsylvania and was married to the University of Pennsylvania psychiatrist Aaron Beck. Her cousin is psychologist Judith S. Beck, who co-founded the Beck Institute for Cognitive Behavior Therapy.

Whitman attended the Dalton School and graduated from the Elizabeth Seeger School. She attended Bennington College and graduated from New York University's Gallatin School of Individualized Study in 1988 and received an MFA from Columbia University School of the Arts in 2005.

Whitman is a former theater actress who made her Broadway debut producing A Raisin in the Sun (2004). She has won multiple Tony and Drama League Awards for producing Hedwig and the Angry Inch, Fun Home, Red, Angels in America, and The Humans.

In 2021, Whitman endowed the Barbara Whitman Award to support a female, trans or non-binary early-career stage director. The $10,000 annual unrestricted award is administrated by the Stage Directors and Choreographers Foundation. She sits on the Board of Governors and the executive committee of The Broadway League.

== Personal life ==
Whitman married David James Carlyon in 1986. The couple has two children, Daniel and Will Carlyon. Both of her children are Broadway actors.
