= James Whitman =

American lawyer, professor, and writer

- Occupations: Professor, writer
- Relatives: Martin J. Whitman (father); Barbara Whitman (sister)
- Awards: Guggenheim Fellow

Academic background
- Education: Yale University (BA, JD); Columbia University (MA); University of Chicago (PhD)
- Thesis: Rule of Roman Law in Romantic Germany, 1790–1860 (1987)
- Doctoral advisor: Arnaldo Momigliano

Academic work
- Discipline: Law
- Sub-discipline: Comparative Law, Comparative Legal History
- Institutions: Stanford University, Yale University
- Main interests: Legal history

James Q. Whitman is an American lawyer and Ford Foundation Professor of Comparative and Foreign Law at Yale University.

== Biography ==
Whitman is the son of investor and philanthropist Martin J. Whitman. He also has a sister, Tony Award-winning producer Barbara Whitman.

He graduated from Yale University with a BA in 1980 and a JD in 1988, from Columbia University with a MA in 1982, and from the University of Chicago with a PhD in 1987. He was a Guggenheim Fellow. In 2015, he was awarded a doctorate honoris causa by the Catholic University of Leuven

Whitman's 2017 book, Hitler's American Model: The United States and the Making of Nazi Race Law, received wide coverage in the news and academia. Whitman demonstrates the extent to which US racial laws (Jim Crow laws, separate but equal legal doctrine) influenced the Nazi Regime in formulating the Nuremberg Laws of September 1935. The leading Nazi student of US racial laws was Heinrich Krieger, a jurist who took three graduate-level businesses courses at the University of Arkansas in spring 1934. While in the United States, he researched how laws across the US segregated and disenfranchised Native Americans, African Americans, and other disfavored groups including Asians, Filipinos and Puerto Ricans. Krieger wrote the memorandum relied upon at the meeting June 1934 in which the Nazi racial laws, known as the Nuremberg Laws, were hashed out. Just as the Jim Crow Laws prohibited and criminalized intermarriage between Whites and Blacks, though as his book points out these types of laws existed in 30 states, many outside of the Jim Crow south. So the Nuremberg Laws prohibited marriages with Jews and threatened punishment. The Nazis departed little from their US model except insofar as that they found it too severe. The so-called one-drop rule, classified as non-white anyone with even a single "Negro" ancestor. This was disturbing even to National Socialist policymaker, who shuddered at the "human hardness" it entailed. According to the Nuremberg Race Laws, a "full Jew" was only someone who had three or four Jewish grandparents; there were also – in National Socialist terminology – "half Jews" and "quarter Jews", but they were not affected by the same discrimination.

In 2017, he was elected a Fellow of the American Academy of Arts and Sciences (AASS).

== Works ==
- The Verdict of Battle: The Law of Victory and the Making of Modern War. Harvard University Press. 2012. ISBN 978-0-674-06714-1.
- The Origins of Reasonable Doubt: Theological Roots of the Criminal Trial. Yale University Press. 2008. ISBN 978-0-300-11600-7.
- Harsh Justice: Criminal Punishment and the Widening Divide Between America and Europe. Oxford University Press. 2005. ISBN 978-0-19-518260-6.
- "The Two Western Cultures of Privacy: Dignity versus Liberty", Yale Law Journal, Vol. 113, April 2004
- The Legacy of Roman Law in the German Romantic Era: Historical Vision and Legal Change, Princeton University Press, 1990, ISBN 978-0-691-05560-2
- Hitler's American Model: The United States and the Making of Nazi Race Law. Princeton University Press, 2017, ISBN 978-0691172422
- Why the Nazis studied American race laws for inspiration. Aeon, 13 December 2016
