= Institutional investor =

Investors who invest professionally and as their main occupation in the stock market

An institutional investor is an entity that pools money to purchase securities, real property, and other investment assets or originate loans. Institutional investors include commercial banks, central banks, credit unions, government-linked companies, insurers, pension funds, sovereign wealth funds, charities, hedge funds, real estate investment trusts, investment advisors, endowments, and mutual funds. Operating companies which invest excess capital in these types of assets may also be included in the term. Activist institutional investors may also influence corporate governance by exercising voting rights in their investments. In 2019, the world's top 500 asset managers collectively managed $104.4 trillion in assets under management (AuM).

Institutional investors appear to be more sophisticated than retail investors, but it remains unclear if professional active investment managers can reliably enhance risk-adjusted returns by an amount that exceeds fees and expenses of investment management because of issues with limiting agency costs. Lending credence to doubts about active investors' ability to 'beat the market', passive index funds have gained traction with the rise of passive investors: the three biggest US asset managers together owned an average of 18% in the S&P 500 Index and together constituted the largest shareholder in 88% of the S&P 500 by 2015. The potential of institutional investors in infrastructure markets is increasingly noted after the financial crises in the early twenty-first century.

== History ==
=== Ancient Rome and Islam ===
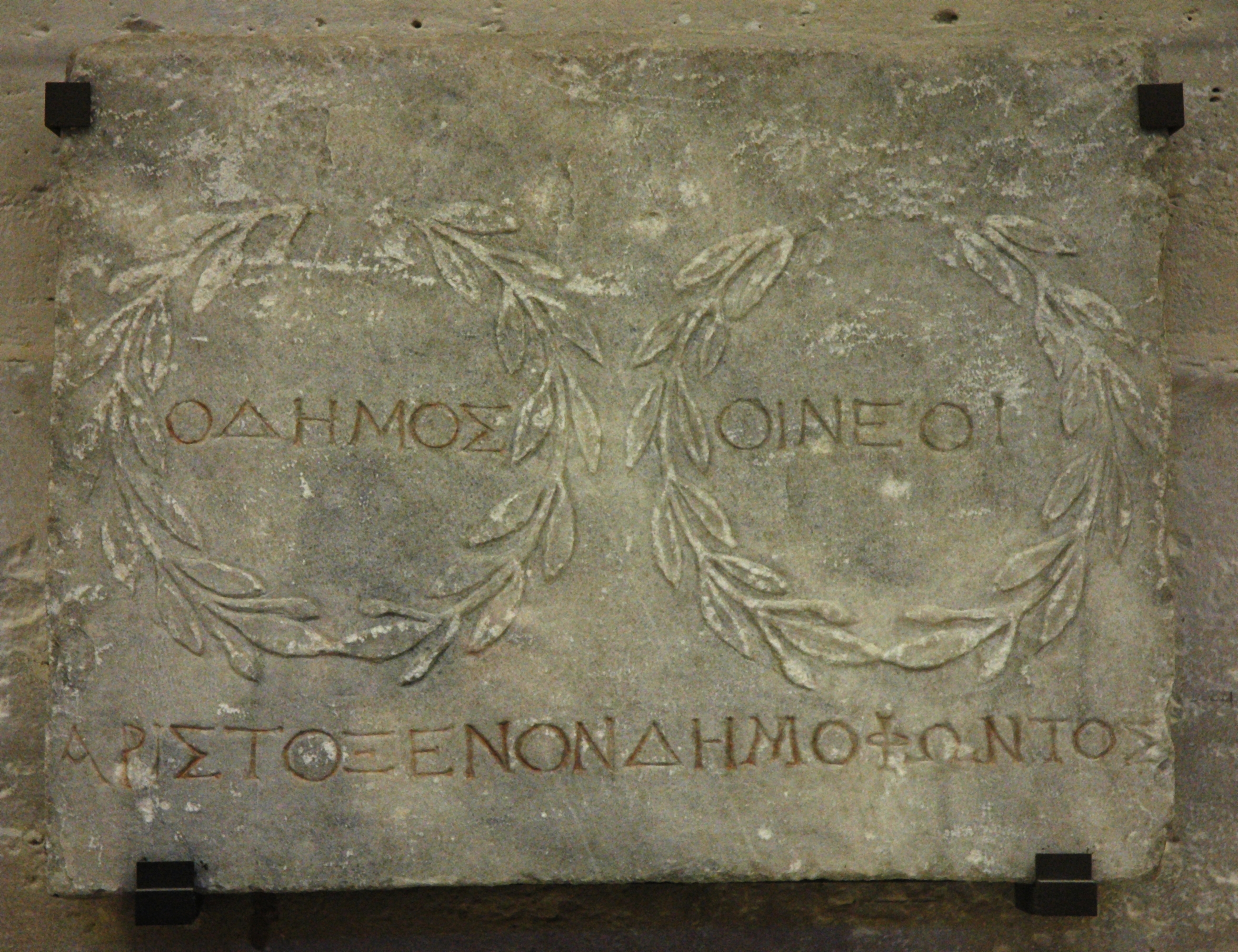
Inscription honoring Aristoxénos, son of Demophon, probably benefactor of the gymnasium in Athens, late third or second century BC, Musée du Louvre

Roman law ignored the concept of juristic person, yet at the time the practice of private evergetism (which dates to, at least, the 4th century BC in Greece) sometimes led to the creation of revenues-producing capital which may be interpreted as an early form of charitable institution. In some African colonies in particular, part of the city's entertainment was financed by the revenue generated by shops and baking-ovens originally offered by a wealthy benefactor. In the south of Gaul, aqueducts were sometimes financed in a similar fashion.

The legal principle of juristic person might have appeared with the rise of monasteries in the early centuries of Christianity. The concept then might have been adopted by the emerging Islamic law. The waqf (charitable institution) became a cornerstone of the financing of education, waterworks, welfare and even the construction of monuments. Alongside some Christian monasteries the waqfs created in the 10th century AD are amongst the longest standing charities in the world (see for instance the Imam Reza shrine).

=== Pre-industrial Europe ===
Following the spread of monasteries, almshouses and other hospitals, donating sometimes large sums of money to institutions became a common practice in medieval Western Europe. In the process, over the centuries those institutions acquired sizable estates and large fortunes in bullion. Following the collapse of the agrarian revenues, many of these institutions moved away from rural real estate to concentrate on bonds emitted by the local sovereign (the shift dates back to the 15th century for Venice, and the 17th century for France and the Dutch Republic). The importance of lay and religious institutional ownership in the pre-industrial European economy cannot be overstated, they commonly possessed 10 to 30% of a given region arable land.

In the 18th century, private investors pool their resources to pursue lottery tickets and tontine shares allowing them to spread risk and become some of the earliest speculative institutions known in the West.

=== Before 1980 ===
Following several waves of dissolution (mostly during the Reformation and the Revolutionary period) the weight of the traditional charities in the economy collapsed; by 1800, institutions solely owned 2% of the arable land in England and Wales. New types of institutions emerged (banks, insurance companies), yet despite some success stories, they failed to attract a large share of the public's savings and, for instance, by 1950, they owned 48% of US equities and certainly even less in other countries.

== Overview ==
Because of their sophistication, institutional investors may be exempt from certain securities laws. For example, in the United States, institutional investors are generally eligible to purchase private placements under Rule 506 of Regulation D as "accredited investors". Further, large US institutional investors may qualify to purchase certain securities generally restricted from retail investment under Rule 144A.

In Canada, companies selling to accredited investors can be exempted from regulatory reporting by each of the provincial Canadian Securities Administrators.

=== Institutional investors as financial intermediaries ===
As intermediaries between individual investors and companies, institutional investors are important sources of capital in financial markets. By pooling constituents' investments, institutional investors arguably reduce the cost of capital for entrepreneurs while diversifying constituents' portfolios. Their greater ability to influence corporate behaviour as well to select investors profiles may help diminish agency costs. Moreover, institutional investors' role as financial intermediaries means they operate under different organizational structures and regulatory frameworks compared to individual blockholders. This unique positioning allows them to leverage their size and expertise to enforce better corporate governance practices.

=== Institutional investors as limited partners, asset owners, and asset managers ===
Within the various types of institutional investors, the roles of limited partners (LPs), asset owners, and asset managers are often conflated. In practice, these types of institutional investors play very different roles in the investment industry. Limited partners and asset owners have legal ownership of their assets and make asset allocation decisions. That is, the primary control over strategic asset allocation decisions rests with limited partners and asset owners, often in consultation with institutional investment consultants. Institutional investors such as pensions, endowments, foundations, and sovereign wealth funds are examples of institutional LPs and asset owners. Limited partners and asset owners may manage their assets directly. Alternatively, they may outsource some or all management of their assets to external asset managers.

In contrast, asset managers act as agents on behalf of limited partners and asset owners. Asset managers generally have little or no discretion on broad, strategic asset allocation decisions. However, asset managers generally have significant discretion regarding portfolio management, security selection, and risk management decisions, subject to any restrictions placed on them by their LPs and asset owners. Asset managers often have a duty to act as a fiduciary to their limited partners and asset owners. Namely, they must place the interests of their LPs and asset owners ahead of their own interests.

For a wide variety of reasons, LPs and asset owners may change asset allocations periodically which can lead to a shift of money, known as asset flows, from one asset class to another, or from one asset manager to another. Traditional asset managers invest in publicly traded equities or fixed income. In contrast, alternative asset managers, such as hedge funds and private equity firms, may invest in both traditional investments and alternative investments. Asset managers maintain relationships with their institutional LPs and asset owners through the process of investor relations. For example, investor relations processes may include the asset manager regularly communicating investment performance, as well as important changes to the investment process, investment team, etc.

=== Institutional investment consultants ===
Institutional investment consultants play an important role in the allocation of assets. These consultants act as an intermediary in an advisory capacity to institutional investors. They generally do not have discretion to manage the assets. Rather, they provide advice as to how the assets may be managed. Namely, they work closely with pension funds and other institutional investors providing independent investment advice that is meant to complement the institutional investors' knowledge and expertise. For example, a consultant may be hired by pension fund to advise the fund on portfolio construction, asset allocation, investment policy statements, performance monitoring, fund manager selection, etc. Institutional investors may also use these consultants as an extra layer of legal protection for their investment committees and boards by conveying that they adhere to industry best practices in their investment processes.

=== Relationship with welfare states ===
Research has examined how welfare state design influences the development and composition of institutional investors. Certain welfare programs reduce household dependence on institutional investors by providing non-asset-based security. Generous pay-as-you-go public pension systems crowd out private pension savings, as workers expecting public benefits save less for retirement. Countries with higher public pension replacement rates have significantly lower private pension assets as a share of GDP. Similarly, family benefits and sickness insurance that provide direct income support reduce household engagement with financial markets. However, this relationship has varied historically, with public and private provisions sometimes expanding together rather than one displacing the other.

In contrast, certain welfare expenditures actively promote institutional investor growth by creating investable assets. Housing policy including subsidies and mortgage interest deductions stabilizes property values and income streams, facilitating real estate investment. Healthcare spending in systems relying on private insurance generates revenue streams that become tradeable assets. This contributes to the "asset economy," where wealth inequality is driven substantially by differential asset ownership rather than income disparities. These patterns operate through distinct institutional channels: insurance companies offer complementary products that supplement public provisions, while pension funds and investment funds contract under generous public pensions but expand when welfare emphasizes risk-pooling mechanisms like unemployment insurance.

== Institutional-investor types ==
- Asset manager
- Bank
- Endowment fund
- Foundation
- Hedge fund
- Insurance company
- Investment company
- Investment trust
- Mutual fund
- Pension fund
- Sovereign wealth fund
- Unit trust and unit investment trust
- Family offices

== Regional ==
In various countries different types of institutional investors may be more important. In oil-exporting countries sovereign wealth funds are very important, while in developed countries, pension funds may be more important.

=== Canada ===
Some examples of important Canadian institutional investors are:

- Canada Pension Plan Investment Board (C$420.4 billion [2019])
- Caisse de dépôt et placement du Québec (C$340.1 billion [2019])
- Ontario Teachers' Pension Plan (C$207.4 billion [2019])
- British Columbia Investment Management Corporation (C$153.4 billion [2019])
- Ontario Municipal Employees Retirement System (C$105 billion)
- Healthcare of Ontario Pension Plan ((C$100 billion)
- AIMCo (C$118.8 billion [2019])
- Labourers Pension Fund of Central and Eastern Canada (C$8 billion)
- College of Applied Arts and Technology Pension Plan (C$13.5 billion)
- OPSEU Pension Trust (C$22 billion)
- Canadian Pacific (C$14.3 billion)
- Canadian National (C$19.4 billion)

=== China ===
China's program to allow institutional investors to invest in its capital market is called Qualified Foreign Institutional Investor (QFII).

=== India ===
In India, the term Foreign Institutional Investor (FII) is used to refer to foreign companies investing in India's capital markets.

Recently FIIs have invested a total of $23 billion in the Indian market under this. With this, Foreign-exchange reserves of India have reached a total of $584 billion and it has become a new record in the Indian market.

Also called Foreign direct investment or FDI, statutory agencies in India like SEBI have prescribed norms to register FIIs and also to regulate such investments flowing in through FIIs. In 2008, FIIs represented the largest institution investment category, with an estimated US$751.14 billion.

Recently, FIIs recorded a net withdrawal of USD 770.67 million in a single trading day, including USD 440.86 million from equities, USD 327.44 million from debt, and USD 2.31 million from hybrid investments. Despite such withdrawals, total FII inflows for 2024 have remained positive at USD 18.241 billion, with fiscal year 2025 inflows at USD 8.924 billion, according to an SBI research report.

=== Japan ===
Japan is home to the world's largest pension fund (GPI) and is home to 63 of the top 300 pension funds worldwide (by Assets Under Management). These include:

- Government Pension Investment Fund ($1045.5 billion [2011])
- Local Government Officials ($165 billion [2004])
- Pension Fund Association ($117 billion [2004])

=== United Kingdom ===
In the UK, institutional investors may play a major role in economic affairs, and are highly concentrated in the City of London's square mile. Their wealth accounts for around two-thirds of the equity in public listed companies. For any given company, the largest 25 investors would have to be able to muster over half of the votes.

=== United States ===
Some examples of important U.S. institutional investors are:

- Alaska Permanent Fund ($73 billion [2021])
- Ensign Peak Advisors ($100 billion [2019])
- CalPERS ($389 billion [2020])
- CalSTRS ($282 billion [2021])
- Harvard University endowment ($42 billion [2020])
- New York State Common Retirement ($248 billion [2020])
- Princeton University endowment ($27 billion [2020])
- Stanford University endowment ($30 billion [2020])
- Teacher Retirement System of Texas ($165 billion [2020])
- Yale University endowment ($31 billion [2020])
- MIT endowment ($24 billion [2023])
- UTIMCO endowment ($75 billion [2024])
- University of Pennsylvania endowment ($21 billion [2023])
- University of Notre Dame endowment ($18.9 billion [2023])
- Columbia University endowment ($13.6 billion [2023])
- Duke University endowment ($18 billion [2023])

The major investor associations are:

- Investment Management Association
- Association of British Insurers
- National Association of Pension Funds
- The Association of Investment Trust Companies

The IMA, ABI, NAPF, and AITC, plus the British Merchant Banking and Securities House Association were also represented by the Institutional Shareholder Committee (ISC). As of August 2014 the ISC effectively became the Institutional Investors Committee (IIC), which comprises the Association of British Insurers, the Investment Management Association and the National Association of Pension Funds.

== See also ==
- Global assets under management
- Investment management
- List of institutional investors in the United Kingdom
- Private placement
