= Buying in =

Buying in may refer to:

- Buying in (poker), a tournament entrance fee
- Buying in (securities), a process in which a buyer whose seller fails to deliver the securities contracted for, can "buy in" the securities from a third party
- Management buy-in, when an outside management becomes a company's new management by buying it.
- "Buy-in" is a noun that means the acceptance and willingness to support or participate in something, such as a new policy or plan.
