= Stub (stock) =

A stub is the remaining capital stock representing the equity in a corporation after a major cash or security distribution—such as a buyout, spin-off, or demerger—removes most of the company's operations. A stub may retain the name of the original corporation or adopt a new one as part of the restructuring.

When the main operating business is spun off or distributed, a stub may remain. This typically consists of residual assets, liabilities, or cash reserves.

Stub stocks commonly arise through spin-offs, where the parent company distributes shares of a subsidiary to existing shareholders. A well-known example is the case of 3Com and Palm.

In 2000, 3Com spun off Palm, but retained approximately 95% of Palm's shares. The remaining equity in 3Com traded as a stub—low-priced and highly speculative compared to Palm’s high valuation. The value of the remaining 3Com equity was implied to be negative when comparing Palm's share price to 3Com's.

Stub stocks may also result from bankruptcies and recapitalisations, when bonds are exchanged for equities as part of a restructured capital structure.

Stub stocks often trade at lower valuations relative to their former parent companies, reflecting higher perceived market uncertainty. Investors assess factors such as debt load, cash flow, and potential for future value recovery if the stub entity is successfully restructured.

Stub investments are considered speculative and high-risk. For example, during the 1987 stock market crash, the Salomon Brothers Stub Stock Index declined by 47.4%, compared to a 33% drop in the S&P 500 over the same period.
