= Trapdoor (finance) =

A trapdoor or drop-down transaction in financial restructuring refers to a technique that moves collateral into unrestricted subsidiaries and out of reach of existing creditors, particularly the movement of intellectual property. Dropdowns can be achieved by two paths: designation of restricted subsidiaries to unrestricted subsidiaries using permitted investment capacity, or by disposal of assets to third parties. In the original drop-down, IP was transferred to a new subsidiary and licenced it back to the parent, new debt can be raised on the collateral stripped from the original creditors.

The maneuver takes advantage of weak covenants in existing debt agreements. Companies first identify investment capacity in their existing covenants and then utilize this capacity to transfer collateral into a restricted, non-loan-party subsidiary. From there, the collateral is moved to an unrestricted subsidiary, making the collateral inaccessible to existing lenders.

The trapdoor was pioneered by retailer J.Crew in its 2016 restructuring to move US$ 250 million of trademarks to the Cayman Islands, where they were beyond the legal reach of existing lenders. The new subsidiary was then used to raise US$300 million of incremental debt from Blackstone.

Since then, other companies in distress have also used the financial maneuver, including Travelport, Revlon, Neiman Marcus, Party City, and Cirque du Soleil. As of 2024, European companies have also begun using the maneuver in debt-management.
