= Buyout =

Investment transaction by which the ownership equity of a company is acquired

In finance, a buyout is an investment transaction by which the ownership equity, or a controlling interest of a company, or a majority share of the capital stock of the company is acquired. The acquirer thereby "buys out" the present equity holders of the target company. Shareholder activism can result in buyouts. A buyout will often include the purchasing of the target company's outstanding debt, which is referred to as "assumed debt" by the purchaser. It is usually synonymous with "acquisition".

== Types ==
Buyouts can often occur when a business is considered to be underperforming and there is an opportunity to improve performance. Types of buyouts include management buyouts, where the management of an enterprise seeks to acquire the business from the existing owners, leveraged buyouts, where the purchaser takes out a loan to make the purchase, frequently secured against the assets of the business they are purchasing and employee buyouts, where the employees of a business collectively purchase the company, often occurring when there is a belief that selling to an external party would be undesirable and within smaller businesses.

All stock buyouts occur when the owners of the company being purchased receive shares in the company that is acquiring them, at an agreed conversion ratio. By doing so, the company acquiring does not have to use significant amounts of capital, but this approach results in the shares of the company acquiring, being diluted. All cash buyouts occur when the acquirer uses cash to complete the buyout.

== Impact ==
Analysis of US private equity buyouts, throughout 1980 to 2013 showed differing impacts of buyouts. For publicly listed companies, numbers of employees typically reduced by 12% over two years subsequent to a buyout, whereas for buyouts of privately owned businesses, the number of employees typically grew by 15%, over the same duration. The largest labor productivity gains were achieved when the buyout involved the purchase of an older and larger company.

Buyouts that involve taking a public company private, appear to generally result in a reduction in innovation investment. This impact is mitigated when the transition to private ownership is achieved as a result of a management buyout.

== Examples ==
In 2013 Dell enlisted private equity firm Silver Lake to take the public company private, in what was the biggest leveraged buyout in the sector at the time. During 2025, a consortium that included Silver Lake and Affinity Partners, agreed to buyout Electronic Arts. In March 2026, Toyota increased its buyout bid to purchase shares in Toyota Industries, from activist investors Elliot Investment Management, with the bid accepted.

== Non-finance usage ==
The term may apply more generally to the purchase by one party of all of the rights of another party with respect to an ongoing transaction between the two. For example:

- An employer may "buy out" an employee's contract by making a single prepayment, so as to have no ongoing obligation to employ the person.
- A government may purchase homes for specific purposes. In the US FEMA has a buyout program that has been purchasing homes in floodplains.
- In Major League Baseball, a club option is an optional year at the end of the contract at the discretion of the team. Usually, the option comes with a "buyout" which represents a fraction of the value of the option. If the team decides not to exercise the option, they will usually pay the buyout.
- In real estate, a landlord can buy out their tenant for a mutually agreed price.

== See also ==
- Buyout clause
- Employee buyout
- Leveraged buyout
- Management buyout
- Growth buyout
- Mergers and acquisitions
- Stub (stock)
- Takeover
