= Restructuring =

Act of reorganizing company structures

Restructuring or reframing is the corporate management term for the act of reorganizing the legal, ownership, operational, or other structures of a company for the purpose of making it more profitable, or better organized for its present needs. Other reasons for restructuring include a change of ownership or ownership structure, demerger, or a response to a crisis or major change in the business such as bankruptcy, repositioning, or buyout. Restructuring may also be described as corporate restructuring, debt restructuring and financial restructuring.

Executives involved in restructuring often hire financial and legal advisors to assist in the transaction's details and negotiations. It may also be done by a newly-hired CEO specifically to make the difficult and controversial decisions, required to save or reposition the company. It generally involves financing debt, selling portions of the company to investors, and reorganizing or reducing operations.

Strategic restructuring reduces financial losses, simultaneously reducing tensions between creditors and equity holders, in order to facilitate a prompt resolution of a distressed situation.

== Corporate debt restructuring ==
Corporate debt restructuring is the reorganization of companies' outstanding liabilities. It is generally a mechanism used by companies which are facing difficulties in repaying their debts. In the process of restructuring, the credit obligations are spread out over a longer period with smaller payments. This can better allow the company to meet its debt obligations. Also, as part of this process, some creditors may agree to exchange debt for some portion of equity. Working with companies in this way in a timely and transparent manner may go a long way to ensure their viability, which is sometimes threatened by internal and external factors. The restructuring process attempts to resolve the difficulties faced by a corporate body and enable it to become viable again.

Steps:

- Ensure the company has enough liquidity to operate during implementation of a complete restructuring
- Produce accurate working capital forecasts
- Provide open and clear lines of communication with creditors who mostly control the company's ability to raise financing
- Update detailed business plan and considerations

== Valuations in restructuring ==
In corporate restructuring, valuations are used as negotiating tools and more than third-party reviews designed for litigation avoidance. This distinction between negotiation and process is a difference between financial restructuring and corporate finance.

From the point of view of transfer pricing requirements, restructuring may entail the need to pay the so-called exit fee (exit charge).

See Valuation (finance) § Valuation of a suffering company for discussion of the approaches taken.

== Restructuring in Europe ==
=== The "London Approach" ===
Historically, European banks handled non-investment grade lending and capital structures that were fairly straightforward. Nicknamed the "London Approach" in the UK, restructurings focused on avoiding debt write-offs rather than providing distressed companies with an appropriately sized balance sheet. This approach became impractical in the 1990s with private equity increasing demand for highly leveraged capital structures that created the market in high-yield and mezzanine debt. Increased volume of distressed debt drew in hedge funds and credit derivatives deepened the market—trends outside the control of both the regulator and the leading commercial banks.

== Characteristics ==
- Cash management and cash generation during crisis
- Impaired Loan Advisory Services (ILAS)
- Retention of corporate management in the form of "stay bonus" payments or equity grants
- Sale of underutilized assets, such as patents or brands
- Outsourcing of operations such as payroll and technical support to a more efficient third party
- Moving of operations such as manufacturing to lower-cost locations
- Reorganization of functions such as sales, marketing, and distribution
- Renegotiation of labor contracts to reduce overhead
- Refinancing of corporate debt to reduce interest payments
- A major public relations campaign to reposition the company with consumers
- Forfeiture of all or part of the ownership share by pre-restructuring stock holders (if the remainder represents only a fraction of the original firm, it is termed a stub)
- Improving the efficiency and productivity through new investments, R&D and business engineering.
- Liability management transactions such as trapdoors

== Results ==
A company that has been restructured effectively will theoretically be leaner, more efficient, better organized, and better focused on its core business with a revised strategic and financial plan. If the restructured company was a leverage acquisition, the parent company will likely resell it at a profit if the restructuring has proven successful.

== See also ==
- Bankruptcy
- Chainsaw Al
- Compromise agreement
- Creditor
- Debt
- Demerger
- Downsizing
- Insolvency
- Layoff
- Presidential Task Force on the Auto Industry
- Spin-out
- Stub (stock)
- Voluntary redundancy
