= Martin J. Whitman School of Management =

Business school at Syracuse University

Whitman School of Management
- Type: Private
- Established: 1919; 107 years ago
- Parent institution: Syracuse University
- Dean: J. Michael Haynie; Alexander McKelvie
- Academic staff: 80+
- Undergraduates: 1,788
- Postgraduates: 450
- Doctoral students: 35
- Location: 721 University Avenue, Syracuse, New York, 13244, USA; 43.0421446°N 76.1340502°W
- Campus: Urban
- Website: whitman.syr.edu

The Martin J. Whitman School of Management is the business school of Syracuse University in Syracuse, New York, United States. Named after Martin J. Whitman, an alumnus and benefactor of the school, the school was established in 1919. The Whitman School offers bachelor's, master's, and doctoral degrees, as well as executive degree programs.

== History ==
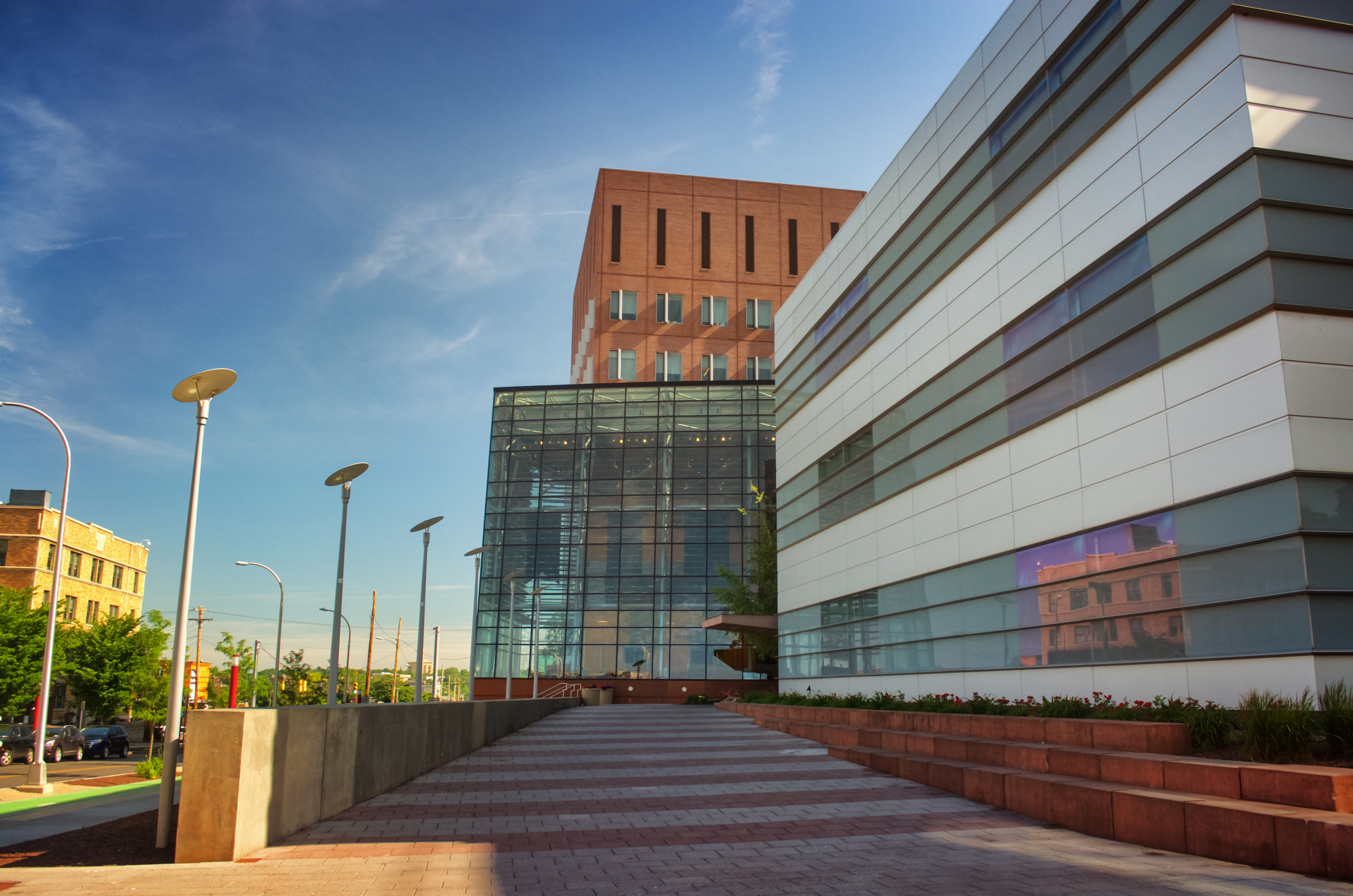
The exterior of Martin J. Whitman School of Management in 2016.

The school was established at Syracuse University in 1919 as the College of Business Administration. By 1920, the school was the 16th school in the United States to receive accreditation from Association to Advance Collegiate Schools of Business (AACSB). The first Supply Chain Management program in the United States began at Whitman in 1919. In 1948, the MBA program was established as the Army Comptrollership Program; the Army Comptrollership Program was established in 1952; and the doctoral program was created in 1965. The Whitman school has been a leader in education innovation and began offering a distance MBA in 1977.

After a major donation from 1949 graduate Martin J. Whitman, founder of Third Avenue Management, and Lois Whitman in June 2003, a new 160,000-square-foot state-of-the-art building was constructed and the university renamed the School of Management after him.

== Student Profile ==
40% of the students in Whitman's full-time MBA program for the Class of 2022 are women. 18% of the Class of 2022 consists of minorities. 31% of the Class of 2022 consists of international students. The Class of 2021 achieved an average GMAT score of 667.

== Degree programs ==
=== Undergraduate programs ===
The Whitman School has several areas of academic study for leading business training and career development. Students can major in one of eight four-year programs, with the option to double-major within the Whitman School or fulfill a dual-major program with another school or college at Syracuse University.

==== Majors ====
Whitman students can choose their field of study from eight different four-year programs. They can also double-major within the Whitman School. The multiple majors program allows students to complete two Whitman majors during the same four-year program.

- Accounting
- Entrepreneurship and Emerging Enterprises
- Finance
- Management
- Marketing Management
- Real Estate
- Retail Management
- Supply Chain Management

Whitman students have the opportunity to pursue a dual-major program with another school or college at Syracuse University. There are three four-year dual major programs and one six-year business and law joint degree program.

- Newhouse School - Whitman School
- iSchool - Whitman School
- College of Arts and Sciences - Whitman School
- College of Law - Whitman School 3+3 Program

The Whitman School offers several minor programs to students at Syracuse University, including accounting, entrepreneurship, finance, management studies, marketing, real estate and retail management.

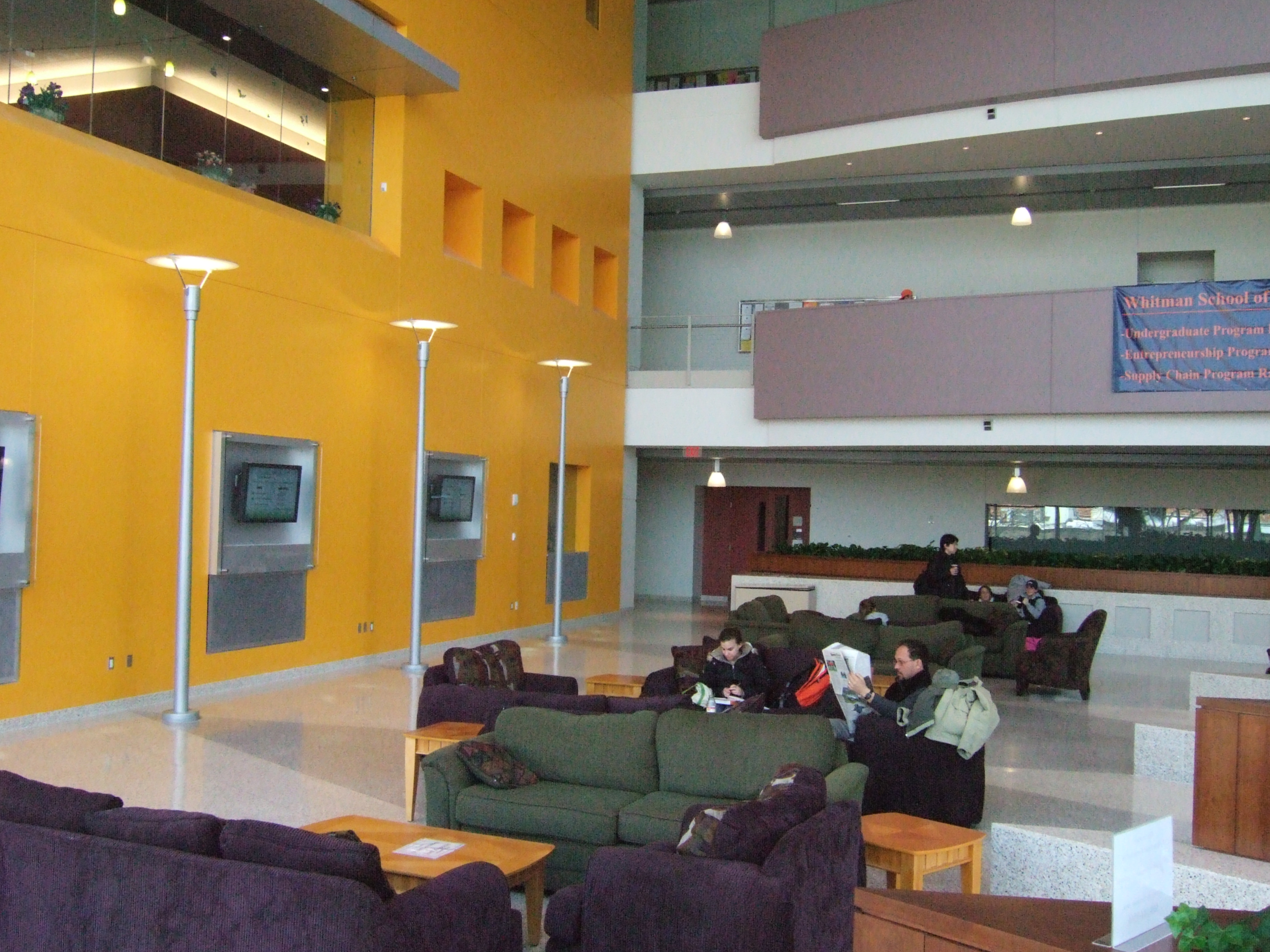
Atrium

=== Masters programs ===
The Whitman School offers several business master's degree programs for college graduates. These programs range from 9 months to 21 months depending on the track taken. Areas of study include professional accounting, business analytics, entrepreneurship & emerging enterprises, finance, marketing, and supply chain management.

==== Online Masters ====
The online master's program, Business@Syracuse, offers three specialized degrees in accounting, business analytics, entrepreneurship, and supply chain management. Participants can complete these programs at a range of acceleration. The online master's degrees are offered through s partnership with 2U Inc.

=== MBA programs ===
==== Full-time MBA ====
The Whitman full-time MBA program may be completed two ways:

Traditional 2-year program - The full-time MBA program comprises a curriculum of 54 credits. During the summer between the first and second academic years, students complete a four-month internship or participate in special international internships co-sponsored by Syracuse University Abroad.

Accelerated MBA - Seasoned business professionals with four or more years of full-time work experience who have an undergraduate degree in business from an AACSB International-accredited institution may take advantage of this streamlined 36-credit alternative to the traditional full-time Syracuse MBA program. The accelerated program is available only on a full-time basis.

Full-time MBA students at the Whitman School specialize in one of seven offered concentrations, including accounting, business analytics, entrepreneurship, finance, marketing management, real estate and supply chain management.

==== Online MBA ====
MBA@Syracuse is Syracuse University's AACSB-accredited online MBA Program. It features the same faculty and curriculum as the full-time MBA program at Syracuse University and is a global program with students interacting on message boards, videoconferencing and participating in virtual classes. 8 different countries and 48 US states were represented in the 2018 student population. In 2018, Financial Times ranked MBA@Syracuse as the #11 online MBA program in the country. Online MBA offerings include accounting, business analytics, entrepreneurship, finance, marketing management and supply chain management.

==== Defense Comptrollership Program (MBA/EMPA) ====
The Defense Comptrollership Program is a collaborative effort between Syracuse University and the Department of Defense. The 14-month long program offers courses through both the Whitman School and Maxwell School at SU. Students who complete the program receive both a Master of Business Administration and Executive Master of Public Administration degree.

==== MD/MBA with Norton College of Medicine ====
In April 20, 2022, SU and State University of New York (SUNY) Upstate Medical University started a joint M.D./MBA program that allows students the opportunity to earn two degrees within a five-year program. Students apply through the American Medical Common Application Service (AMCAS) portal to initially be accepted into SUNY Upstate’s Alan and Marlene Norton College of Medicine.

Tuition during the MBA portion of the program is determined by Syracuse University. Tuition for the remaining four years is at the SUNY rate for medical (MD) education.

=== PhD programs ===
The Whitman School offers 4-year PhD programs. Participants specialize in one of six offered concentrations, including accounting, finance, entrepreneurship, management, marketing and supply chain management. PhD program students also have teaching and research opportunities. Areas of study offered for PhD degrees include accounting, finance, entrepreneurship, management, marketing, and supply chain management.

== Centers, programs and institutes ==
The Whitman School is home to various centers and institutes specially dedicated to a range of professional areas.

- Africa Business Program: The Africa Business Program is an annual conference surrounding the current business and entrepreneurship efforts taking place in Africa. Its mission is to build partnerships between businesses in Central New York and African countries and increase faculty interest and student knowledge of Africa at the Whitman School.
- Ballentine Investment Institute: The Ballentine Investment Institute offers Whitman students special opportunities to participate in programs such as the Orange Value Fund, LLC, the Stuart Frankel & Company NYSE Scholars Program, and Bloomberg Product Certification among others. The Ballentine Institute was established in 1992, made possible by an endowment by Whitman alumnus Steve Ballentine, president and CEO of Ballentine Capital Management, Inc.
- Earl V. Snyder Innovation Management Center: The Earl V. Snyder Innovation Management Center gives students the chance to grow their knowledge in innovation management and opportunities to participate in innovation efforts at technology, industrial product, and consumer goods companies and organizations.
- Falcone Center for Entrepreneurship: The Falcone Center for Entrepreneurship has a mission to facilitate entrepreneurial efforts at Syracuse University and in the local Syracuse communities by giving Whitman students the opportunity to take part in programs such as the Hatchery Student Business Incubator, the Panasci Business Plan Competition, D’Aniello Internships, and the Entrepreneurship Club.
- H.H. Franklin Center for Supply Chain Management: The H.H. Franklin Center for Supply Chain Management seeks to improve the knowledge of supply chain management in the campus community. It also oversees the annual Harry E. Salzberg Memorial Program. The Franklin Center is one of the earliest transportation programs in the country and celebrated its 100th anniversary in 2019.
- Harry E. Salzberg Memorial Program: This program was established in 1949 and is considered one of the most prestigious awards in transportation and supply chain management. Former recipients and distinguished practitioners in the field can nominate individuals or companies for consideration.
- Institute for an Entrepreneurial Society: The Institute for an Entrepreneurial Society, or IES, produces research on the political economy of entrepreneurship. Its mission is to engage and educate the campus community about entrepreneurial society and supporting entrepreneurial innovation.
- James D. Kuhn Real Estate Center: The James D. Kuhn Real Estate Center was created in 2006 with an endowment by a Whitman alumnus, James D. Kuhn, who is the president of the Newmark Grubb Knight Frank real estate brokerage firm, the fourth-largest global firm of its kind in the world. The Real Estate Center is a place for students to study and research, and it aims to give students educational opportunities in real estate management.
- Kiebach Center for International Business Studies: The Kiebach Center for International Business Studies aims to promote and increase knowledge in international business at Syracuse University. It hosts community programs for local businesses and students to participate in, and also publishes a research journal, the Journal of Developmental Entrepreneurship, which focuses on research around microenterprise and small business development. The center also has several partnerships that provide additional international business resources: Walter H. and Dorothy B. Diamond Institute of International Taxation and Trade, Werner Heumann Institute for Cultural Understanding in International Business, the Shanghai-Syracuse International School of Business, the Sejong-Syracuse MBA program, and the Whitman-ICFAI program.
- Sustainable Enterprise Partnership: The Sustainable Enterprise Partnership (SEP) is a collaboration between the Whitman School and the College of Engineering and Computer Science at Syracuse University, the State University of New York - College of Environmental Science and Forestry, and the Syracuse Center of Excellence in Environmental and Energy Systems. The SEP conducts research through the Sustainable Building and Infrastructure Grant Program, holds seminars on ways for businesses and organizations to incorporate sustainability into their products and practices, and awards scholarships for students and researchers interested in sustainable buildings and infrastructure. The SEP also offers a Certificate of Advanced Study in Sustainable Enterprise (CASSE) capstone for SU and SUNY-ESF students.
- Robert H. Brethen Operations Management Institute: The Robert H. Brethen Operations Management Institute was established 1988. Its goal is to foster the development and knowledge in operations management for students, practitioners and the global scholar community interested in the field. The institute also supports SU's chapter or APICS.
- Transactional Records Access Clearinghouse: TRAC was established in 1989 as a research center and was jointly sponsored by the S.I. Newhouse School of Public Communications and the Whitman School.

== Reputations & rankings ==
Business school rankings

United States
- Bloomberg MBA: 61
- USNWR MBA: 57

Global
- QS MBA: 151-200

- Department of Entrepreneurship and Emerging Enterprises ranked #2nd globally for Research Productivity, and #17 in The Princeton Review rankings.
- Bloomberg BusinessWeek ranks undergraduate program at #23.
- U.S. News & World Report undergraduate program ranked #40.
- Bloomberg BusinessWeek's MBA program ranked 61st
- Poets & Quants undergraduate program ranked #34
- U.S. News & World Report MBA program ranked 57th (2023)
- Princeton Review's online MBA program ranked 20th
- Selected as a NASDAQ Entrepreneurship Center of Excellence in 2016.
- Bloomberg BusinessWeek's Business School ROI Calculator ranked the MBA program 2nd nationally (1st among privates) in 2024.

== Notable alumni ==
- Daniel A. D'Aniello, billionaire businessman, cofounder and chairman of the Carlyle Group
- Ritu Agarwal, Indian-American management scientist, professor at the University of Maryland, College Park.
- William Q. Hayes, United States District Judge of the United States District Court for the Southern District of California
- James F. McCall, former Comptroller of the United States Army
- Arthur Rock, billionaire businessman and investor, early investor in major firms including Intel, Apple Computer and others.
- Martin J. Whitman, founder & Co-Chief Investment Officer Third Avenue Management in New York City

== See also ==
- List of United States business school rankings
- List of business schools in the United States
