= Hybrid Investment =

Hybrid investments or just hybrids, also known as derivatives, are a form of investment that combines equity and debt-like features, allowing companies to protect themselves against financial risks in securities transactions. This form of investment allows traders and investment professionals to diversify their asset portfolio. Hybrid Investments work to maintain a risk balance for both the business and the investor.

== Types ==
The two most popular types of Hybrid Investments are Preferred Stock and Convertible Bonds.

- Preferred Stocks – Stockholders receive dividend payments on a regular basis and gain funds when share values rise on security exchanges.
- Convertible Bonds – Bondholders periodically receive interest payments. An exchange of bonds for a specified number of equity shares is acceptable, but only in accordance with the convertible bond covenant.

Investors buying these products look to accumulate periodic fixed-interest payments and profit when share prices rise in financial markets.
