= Martin J. Whitman =

American investment advisor (1924–2018)

- Born: September 30, 1924; Bronx, New York
- Died: April 16, 2018 (aged 93); Manhattan, New York
- Education: Syracuse University (BS); The New School (MA)
- Occupations: Investor, philanthropist
- Known for: Namesake of Martin J. Whitman School of Management
- Children: 3, including Barbara Whitman and James Whitman

Martin J. Whitman (September 30, 1924 – April 16, 2018) was an American investment adviser and a strong critic of the direction of recent changes in Generally Accepted Accounting Principles (GAAP) in the U.S. He was founder and Co-Chief Investment Officer of Third Avenue Management, and Portfolio Manager of the Third Avenue Value Fund.

== Early life and education ==
Whitman was born to a Jewish family in the Bronx, New York. He served in the US Navy in the Pacific during World War II. Returning to New York state, he graduated from Syracuse University with a B.S. in business administration in 1949. He held an M.A. in economics from the New School of Social Research. He worked for various investment firms in New York City before setting up his own company in 1974, M.J. Whitman & Co. His first big successful investment was his purchase of $100,000 in mortgage bonds issued by the bankrupt Penn Central Railroad. He later sold the bonds for five times his original investment.

== Views on Generally Accepted Accounting Principles ==
Whitman used the quarterly shareholder letters of his fund as a running critique of what he called the "primacy of the income account" ("primacy of the income account" means that corporate wealth is created only by flows, i.e., having positive earnings, and/or cash flows for a period), which he argued serves only short-term speculators rather than long-term investors. For example, in his July 31, 2004 letter Wayback Machine, he wrote that recent developments in GAAP "...increasingly impose unneeded and counter-productive burdens on American corporations, American management and American capital markets. GAAP... ought to be geared toward meeting the needs and desires of creditors rather than the needs and desires of short-term stock market speculators... [T]he amount of money invested in credit instruments of all types in our economy dwarfs the amount of funds invested in equities." Furthermore, "Most private companies, given a choice, seek to enhance [Net Asset Value] by means other than having reported operating income, which is taxable at maximum rates."

He argued that "in GAAP... material facts [should] be disclosed in a conservative, consistent, and reliable manner", and that "Financial statements [should] be prepared under the assumption that the users of such financial statements are reasonably intelligent, reasonably diligent, and are people who understand not only the uses, but also the limitations, of GAAP... [T]he most GAAP can give... are objective benchmarks which the analyst then uses as a tool to determine his, or her, version of economic truth and economic reality."

As an example of the difference in these perspectives, he discussed the current (as of 2004) controversy over whether stock options ought to be expensed using "fair value method" or "intrinsic value method" and points out that the issue of stock dilution is "a stockholder problem, not a company problem". He pointed out that to a creditor there is "a world of difference in the credit-worthiness of an issuer who... pays out... $200 million per annum in cash for executive compensation... [and one who] issues stock options on a non-dividend-paying common stock with a "fair value" of $200 million" (the point being that the latter is of almost no concern to a creditor).

In particular, he cited as wrongheaded an advertisement in the Wall Street Journal of April 27, 2004, which argued that "financial statements exist to help investors make informed investment decisions". He responded, "That statement is just plain wrong from either a public policy point of view or a creditor's point of view. Financial statements exist to fulfill the needs and desires of many constituencies: managements, creditors, governments, customers, etc." (italics in original).

== Economic views ==
Although a strong advocate of capitalism, Whitman was a critic of free markets in the sense advocated by Milton Friedman and Friedrich Hayek. For example, in a discussion of John Maynard Keynes, Friedman and Hayek, Whitman wrote that the three "…great economists… missed a lot of details that are part and parcel of every value investor's daily life." While calling Hayek "100% right" in his critique of the pure command economy, he wrote "However, in no way does it follow, as many Hayek disciples seem to believe, that government is per se bad and unproductive while the private sector is, per se good and productive. In well-run industrial economies, there is a marriage between government and the private sector, each benefiting from the other." As illustrations of this, he points at "Japan after World War II, Singapore and the other Asian Tigers, Sweden and China today… Government has a necessary role in determining how control persons [management, boards of directors, etc.] are incentivized…

He argued, in particular, for the value of government-provided credit and of carefully crafted tax laws. Further, Whitman argued (explicitly against Hayek) that "a free market situation is probably also doomed to failure if there exist control persons who are not subject to external disciplines imposed by various forces over and above competition." The lack of these disciplines, said Whitman, lead to "1. Very exorbitant levels of executive compensation… 2. Poorly financed businesses with strong prospects for money defaults on credit instruments… 3. Speculative bubbles… 4. Tendency for industry competition to evolve into monopolies and oligopolies… 5. Corruption." For all of these he provides recent examples from the U.S. economy, which he considers to be in some respects under-regulated, although in other respects over-regulated (he is generally opposed to Sarbanes-Oxley ).

He believed that an apparently "free" relationship—that between a corporation and its investors and creditors—is actually a blend of "voluntary exchanges" and "coercion". For example, there are "voluntary activities, where each individual makes his or her own decision whether to buy, sell, or hold" but there are also what he defined as "[c]oercive activities, where each individual security holder is forced to go along…provided that a requisite majority of other security holders so vote…" His examples of the latter included proxy voting, most merger and acquisition transactions, certain cash tender offers, and reorganization or liquidation in bankruptcy. Whitman also states that "Corporate America would not work at all unless many activities continued to be coercive."

"I am one with Professor Friedman that, other things being equal, it is far preferable to conduct economic activities through voluntary exchange relying on free markets rather than through coercion. But Corporate America would not work at all unless many activities continued to be coercive."

== Retirement ==
In February 2012, Whitman announced that he was retiring from active management of the $3.2 billion Third Avenue Value Fund. he will hand over responsibility to his longtime co-manager and protégé, Ian Lapey on March 1, 2012.

== Philanthropy ==
In 2003, Whitman donated $23 million to Syracuse University which renamed its School of Management after Whitman, becoming the Martin J. Whitman School of Management. The same year, he was elected member of the board of trustees at Syracuse University. He was also an adjunct faculty member at Yale School of Management In 2008, he and his wife founded The Lois and Martin Whitman Scholarship Fund at Tel Aviv University to support the educational needs of Arab-Israeli students. Whitman related his experience as a Jew in the United States, “I spent half my life as a second-class citizen” and his inability to attend Ivy League colleges at the time. Sympathizing with their situation, he told the students it is important “to give scholarships to Arab students at Tel Aviv University." Whitman was a supporter of the Two state solution in Israel.

== Personal life ==
Whitman's wife, Lois Whitman, is an attorney and social worker. Since 1994, she has been the founder and director of the Children's Rights Division at the international rights monitoring organization Human Rights Watch. They have three children and six grandchildren. He died on April 16, 2018, at the age of 93 in New York City. His daughter is Tony Award-winning producer Barbara Whitman and his son Yale Law School professor James Whitman.

== Works ==
- Whitman, Martin J. (1999). Value Investing: A Balanced Approach. New York: John Wiley & Sons. ISBN 0-471-16292-2.
- Whitman, Martin J. & Shubik, Martin (2005). The Aggressive Conservative Investor (2nd ed.). Hoboken, NJ: John Wiley & Sons. ISBN 0-471-76805-7.
- Whitman, Martin J. & Diz, Fernando (2009). Distress Investing: Principles And Technique. Hoboken, NJ: John Wiley & Sons. ISBN 978-0-470-11767-5.
- Whitman, Martin J. & Diz, Fernando (2013). Modern Security Analysis: Understanding Wall Street Fundamentals. John Wiley & Sons. ISBN 978-1-118-39004-7.
