= Buying in (securities) =

Securities trading practice

In the securities market, buying in refers to a process by which the buyer of securities, whose seller fails to deliver the securities contracted for, can buy the securities from a third party and demand the difference in price from the original seller. Thus, the original seller need not deliver the sold security, but must provide the cash difference of the security sold. A buy in event occurs when the original counterparty, the seller, fails to make delivery on the actual security transacted.

== Securities market use ==
=== Buy-in rule on the UK equity market ===
On the English stock exchange, a transaction by which, if a member has sold securities which he fails to deliver on settling day, or any of the succeeding ten days following the settlement, the buyer may give instructions to a stock exchange official to "buy in" the stock required. The official announces the quantity of stock, and the purpose for which he requires it, and whoever sells the stock must be prepared to deliver it immediately. The original seller has to pay the difference between the two prices, if the latter is higher than the original contract price. A similar practice, termed "selling out," prevails when a purchaser fails to take up his securities.
