= Heinrich Krieger =

German legal researcher (1908–?)

Heinrich Karl Krieger (born 6 August 1908) was a German legal scholar who studied race law in the United States in the early 1930s. His research on American racial legislation was later cited in discussions among Nazi legal officials during the development of racial policy in Germany.

== Biography ==
Heinrich Krieger was born on 6 August 1908 and studied law and mechanical engineering. In 1934, Krieger studied business in the United States as an international student during the spring of 1934 at the University of Arkansas. While in America, he apparently also examined American legal frameworks relating to race, including segregation laws, anti-miscegenation statutes, and the legal status of minority populations.

Krieger published a book titled Race Law in the United States in 1936. His work analyzed how American law defined racial categories and enforced racial separation through legislation. He later conducted research in Africa and published research on race law in South Africa and South West Africa.

During the Second World War, Krieger served in the German Army. He later became an educator specialising in development aid and international relations.

== Role in Nazi legal discussions ==
Historical scholarship indicates that Nazi legal officials examined American racial law as part of their efforts to develop a legal framework for racial classification in Germany.

A memorandum written by Krieger was among the materials considered during meetings of Nazi jurists in 1934, which contributed to the formulation of the racial policies later codified in the Nuremberg Laws.

== Publications ==
- "Principles of Indian Law and the Act of June 18, 1934", The George Washington Law Review (1935)
- Race Law in the United States (1936)
