= Ágnes Ságvári =

Hungarian historian

- Born: 19 November 1928; Budapest, Hungary
- Died: 13 June 2000 (aged 71); Budapest, Hungary
- Occupation: historian
- Years active: 1944-1998
- Known for: Holocaust studies
- Spouse: András Tardos

Ágnes Ságvári (19 November 1928 – 13 June 2000) was a Hungarian historian most known for her historical research on the history of the Hungarian Holocaust. After serving in the party apparatus of the state, Ságvári began her career at the Party History Institute and then became the director of the Budapest City Archives. In 1980, she was honored with the Ervin Szabó Medal for her contributions as a librarian. From 1986 to 1998, she was the chair of the department on Administrative and Comparative History of the 20th Century at Budapest University.

== Early life ==
Ágnes Ságvári was born on 19 November 1928 in Budapest, Hungary to Erdős Rozália (née Sándorné) and Sándor Ságvári; the original family name was Spitzer. She came from a middle-class, well-educated background. Of Jewish heritage, her father was a well-known lawyer and her mother was a teacher and the vice president of the Hungarian Jewish Women's Association. Her aunt, Jozefina Ságvári (formerly Spitzer) was the mother of the Hungarian scientist, Egon Orowan. She was the sister of the communist dissident, Endre Ságvári (hu). She attended a shorthand and typing school in Móricz Zsigmond Square, completing her studies in 1944.

== Career ==
After her studies, Ságvári worked in a factory between 1944 and 1945 and then became an administrator at the Hungarian Communist Party center beginning in 1945. At the same time, she joined the communist party and the Hungarian Democratic Youth League (Hungarian: Magyar Demokratikus Ifjúsági Szövetség (MADISZ)), becoming a student organizer. In 1947, she went to work at the Hungarian State Police Department State Security (Hungarian: Magyar Államrendőrség Államvédelmi Osztálya, ÁVO), and entered college to become a detective lieutenant. The following year, she joined the apparatus of the Hungarian Working People's Party working in the cadre department for the next eight years.

During the same period, Ságvári was studying history and political economics at Pázmány Péter Catholic University and graduated in 1951. In 1956 she was appointed to the commissioner's office of the Hungarian Socialist Workers' Central Committee and in 1960 was made a senior research fellow and deputy director of the Party History Institute. In 1962, she defended her PhD thesis Mass movements and political struggles in Budapest from 1945 to 1947. Two years later, in 1964, Ságvári became the senior fellow of the Institute of History for the Hungarian Academy of Sciences. In 1968, she became a lecturer at the Department of Scientific Socialism at the József Attila University.

Beginning in 1970, Ságvári joined the Budapest City Archives as its director until 1985. She immediately set out to organize the materials for the archive which had been neglected for some time. Because the old Town Hall building had insufficient space, and documents were located at various holding sites throughout the city, the first task was to collect them and organize them. Ságvári resumed the publishing efforts of the archive, and implemented bookbinding, filming and restoration efforts to preserve and safely maintain the records. In addition to writing and promoting the archive, she worked with the Association of Hungarian Librarians to create a series for the study of the city history. Ságvári was awarded the Ervin Szabó Medal (hu), in recognition of her significant contributions as a librarian, in 1980. In 1986, she led the drive to create the Association of Hungarian Archivists.

Ságvári began publishing works on Hungarian political history in 1945. Her early work was ideologically based, but to gain scientific recognition for her work, Ságvári increasingly moved away from politics and began work on the post-1945 history of Budapest. Using comparative urban history research, she gained insight into Hungary's history through a broader study of European history. Though an unpopular subject, she studied the Hungarian Holocaust and in the later period of her work evaluated the deportation of Hungarian Jews in Transcarpathia and looted Jewish property. After she left the Archives, Ságvári continued her career at Budapest University, serving as the chair of the department on Administrative and Comparative History of the 20th Century, until her retirement in 1998.

== Death and legacy ==
Ságvári died on 13 June 2000 in Budapest. In 2001, she was one of the subjects of Margit Stolzenburg's work Women's Anger: Life stories of eleven unusual European women (German: Frauenwut umgebaut: Lebensgeschichten elf ungewöhnlicher Europäerinnen).
