= Louisa Hay Kerr =

Louisa Hay Kerr (1806 – December 1900) was an English writer, composer, and translator. She published several translations including A History of Servia and the Servian Revolution by Leopold von Ranke from German to English in 1847. Her translation received praising reviews.

She was born in India and married Alexander John Kerr in 1825. She customary took his name to publish her works.

She published three collections of songs. The first appears to have been in 1832 entitled Melodies. The second was The Coronale: A Collection of Songs.

== Works ==
- Melodies Illustrations by R. Westall and A. E. Chalon. (1832)
- The Coronale: A Collection of Songs (1837)
- Songs of Hope and Memory (1847)
- (Tr.) Ranke's A History of Servia and the Servian Revolution (1847)
- (Tr.) The Exiles of Salzburg and Other Stories, originally by Karl Gustav Nieritzr (1880)
- (Tr.) Menzikoff or the Dangers of Wealth originally by Nieritz (1894)
