= Archives of Sremski Karlovci =

Аrchives in Serbia

Serbian Academy of Sciences and Arts Archive in Sremski Karlovci
- Архив Српске академије наука и уметности у Сремским Карловцима
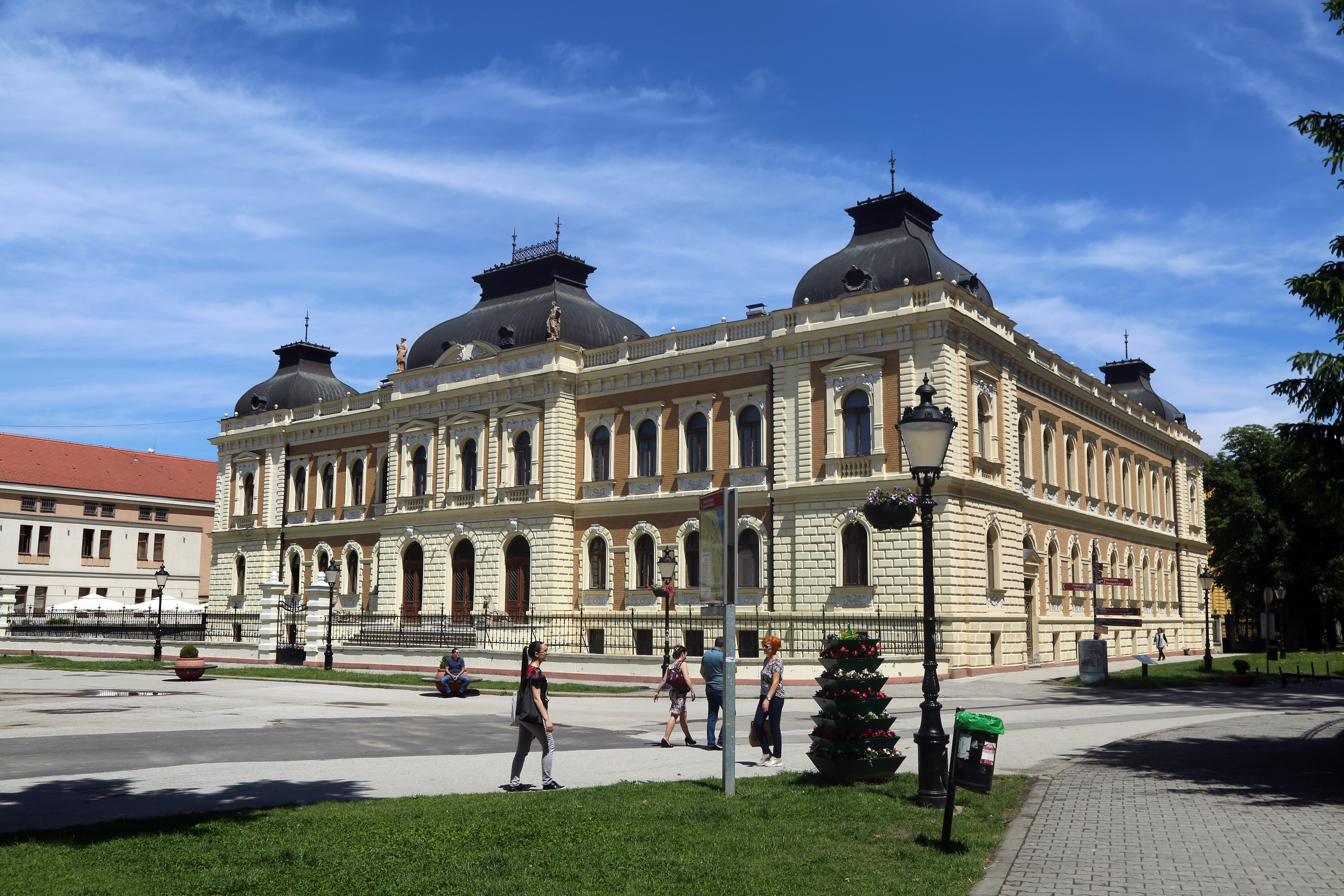
- Building of the Saint Arsenije Serbian Orthodox Seminary housing the archives

Agency overview
- Formed: 1690; 336 years ago
- Jurisdiction: Serbian Academy of Sciences and Arts
- Headquarters: Branka Radičevića Square 17, 21 205 Sremski Karlovci, Vojvodina, Serbia; 45°12′15″N 19°56′03″E
- Website: Official website

The Archives of Sremski Karlovci (Serbian: Архив у Сремским Карловцима, romanized: Arhiv u Sremskim Karlovcima), formally the Serbian Academy of Sciences and Arts Archives in Sremski Karlovci (Serbian: Архив Српске академије наука и уметности у Сремским Карловцима, romanized: Arhiv Srpske akademije nauka i umetnosti u Sremskim Karlovcima), located in Sremski Karlovci, are the first archives in modern Serbian history. Established by the Serbian clergy of the Metropolitanate of Karlovci, since 1949 archives are managed by the Serbian Academy of Sciences and Arts. The archives were effectively established at the time of the Great Migrations of the Serbs in 1690, during which Serbian Orthodox clergy brought books, charters of Serbian rulers, sacred inventories, ecclesiastical letters, and other documents from the Balkans regions of the Ottoman Empire to the Habsburg Monarchy.

This initial collection was expanded through correspondence conducted by Patriarch Arsenije III Crnojević and his successors with various institutions and individuals in the Habsburg Monarchy, Ottoman and revolutionary and subsequently independent Principality and Kingdom of Serbia, Russian Empire, and other countries. At the time, the town of Sremski Karlovci served as the religious, cultural, and political seat of Serb community in Habsburg lands. Being the primary archive in the town, today materials preserved in its collections are crucial for studying the political, cultural, and economic history of the Serbian people in present-day Vojvodina and other parts of the former Austro-Hungary.

During the World War II in Yugoslavia, the archives were closed by the Independent State of Croatia Ustasha regime and partially damaged. Local German officers, motivated by Leopold von Ranke's historical interest in Serbian history, nevertheless ordered the archives to be secured, saving most of its documents until the end of the war.

In 1949, the Holy Synod of the Serbian Orthodox Church handed over the archives of the Metropolitanate of Karlovci and the Patriarchate of Karlovci to the Serbian Academy of Sciences and Arts for preservation and organization for scientific use for an initial period of 50 years that was twice extended in 1999 and 2009. The archives remained permanently housed in the building of the Saint Arsenije Serbian Orthodox Seminary.

== History ==
=== Foundation ===
In 1683, the Ottoman Empire besieged Vienna, but was routed by an allied army that included the Holy Roman Empire led by the Habsburgs. The imperial forces, among whom Prince Eugene of Savoy was rapidly becoming prominent, followed up the victory with others, notably one near Mohács in 1687 and another at Zenta in 1697, and in January 1699, the sultan signed the treaty of Karlowitz by which he admitted the sovereign rights of the house of Habsburg over nearly the whole of Hungary (including Serbs in Vojvodina). As the Habsburg forces retreated, they withdrew 37,000 Serb families under Patriarch Arsenije III Čarnojević of the Serbian Patriarchate of Peć. In 1690 and 1691 Emperor Leopold I had conceived through a number of edicts (Privileges) the autonomy of Serbs in his Empire, which would last and develop for more than two centuries until its abolition in 1912. This framework which included religious tolerance and freedom from serfdom enabled the development of religious, cultural and political institutions and life at the time when modern day Central Serbia was under the Ottoman rule. The archive's origin is linked to the Great Migration of 1690, during which Serbian clergy and people brought books, charters of Serbian rulers, sacred inventories, ecclesiastical letters, and other documents into their new center in Sremski Karlovci.

=== Archives of the Orthodox Church in Sremski Karlovci ===
The new Metropolitanate of Karlovci was formally established in 1713 with the institution providing more organized protection for documents saved during the Great Migration. The first inventory of the archive dates back to 1719. The original minutes of the 1848 May Assembly in Sremski Karlovci that led to the proclamation of Serbian Vojvodina were preserved in the archive. The building of the Clerical High School of Saint Arsenije which houses the archival collection was completed in 1902. Serbian historian, Orthodox priest, academic, and publisher, Dimitrije Ruvarac, established journal titled Arhiv za istoriju Srpske pravoslavne Karlovačke mitropolije that was published between 1911 and 1914 but was interrupted by the beginning of the World War I. The journal continued his earlier work of documenting and analyzing important historical records from the Patriarchal and Metropolitan Archives in Sremski Karlovci.

During World War II in Yugoslavia, the archives were closed by the Ustasha regime and partially damaged. However, a German officer, inspired by historian Leopold von Ranke's interest in Serbian leader Karađorđe, ordered the archive to be secured, thereby saving most of its documents. In the immediate aftermath of the World War II the building of the archives temporarily housed the Archives of Vojvodina as well.

=== Serbian Academy of Sciences and Arts Archives in Sremski Karlovci ===
On July 4, 1949, the Holy Synod of the Serbian Orthodox Church transferred the archives of the Metropolitanate of Sremski Karlovci to the Serbian Academy of Sciences and Arts for preservation and organization for scientific use. This agreement, which extended SANU's responsibility for the archives, was set for 50 years and expired in 1999. The agreement was subsequently renewed twice, each time for ten-year periods. On December 7, 2018, with the support from the Government of Vojvodina Serbian Academy opened Audiovisual Archives and Center for Digitalization at the archives in Sremski Karlovci. When the third agreement between the Serbian Orthodox Church and SANU expired in 2020 the church expressed its intention to transfer religious documents back to the church while ensuring their continued accessibility for researchers. This request was based on the recommendation of the Ministry of Culture and the State Archives of Serbia that the entire sacral fundus should be nominally transferred to the Archives of the Serbian Orthodox Church while materials related to state and administrative issues should nominally be the responsibility of the Archives of Vojvodina.

== See also ==
- List of archives in Serbia
- Archives of the Serbian Orthodox Church
- Archives of the Eparchy of Buda
- State Archives of Serbia
- Archives of Vojvodina
- Historical Archives "Syrmia" of Sremska Mitrovica
