= List of archives in Hungary =

This is list of archives in Hungary.

== Archives in Hungary ==
- National Archives (Hungary)
- National Audiovisual Archive of Hungary
- Budapest City Archives
- Blinken Open Society Archives
- The Artpool Archives
- The Hungarian Electronic Library
- Archive of the Eparchy of Buda

== See also ==
- List of archives
- List of libraries in Hungary
- List of museums in Hungary
- Culture of Hungary
