= Klimo Library =

First public library of Hungary

- Klimo Könyvtár
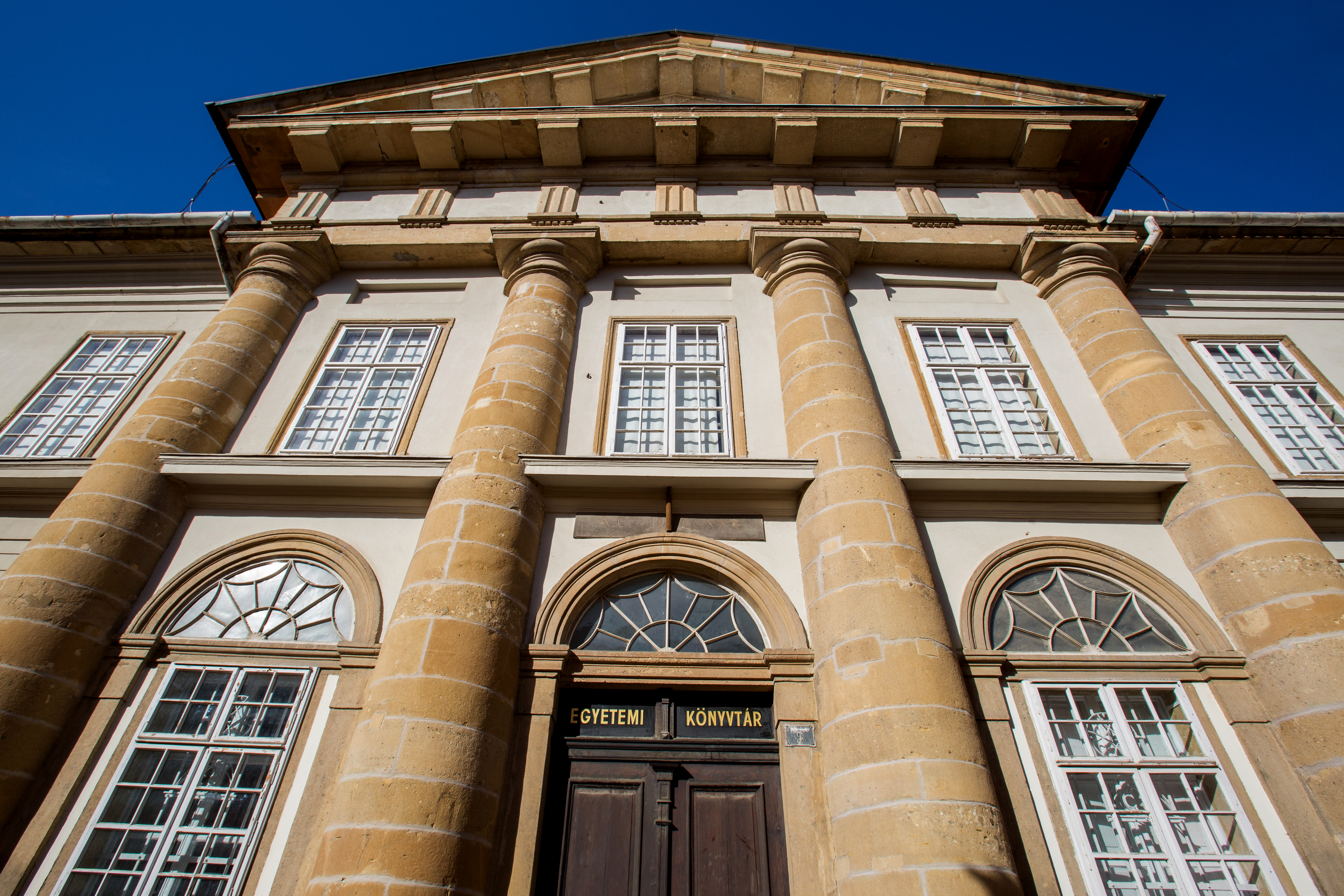
- The current 19th century building of the library
- 46.078048°N 18.227158°E
- Location: 7621 Pécs, Szepesy Ignác st. 3., Hungary
- Type: public and university library, former special library
- Established: 1774; 252 years ago
- Architect: József Piacsek

Collection
- Specialisation: political science and jurisprudence (formerly)
- Items collected: historical (currently) and interdisciplinary documents, items (formerly)

Access and use
- Access requirements: Hungarian citizenship or registration, special requirements for research

Other information
- Director: Gábor Szeberényi (director of the university library)
- Parent organisation: University of Pécs
- Affiliation: Roman Catholic Diocese of Pécs
- Website: www.lib.pte.hu/en

The Klimo Library (Hungarian: Klimo Könyvtár), Klimo Collection (Hungarian: Klimo Gyűjtemény) or Episcopal Library (Hungarian: Püspöki Könyvtár) established in 1774 is the first public library of Hungary. It was established in Pécs by György Klimó, Bishop of Pécs and it is still operating. Although Klimó could not establish a university in Pécs, he still opened the library for the public. Until the Great War, the library was operating constantly under the episcopal see. After that, the building of the library and its collection were given to the university by Bishop Gyula Zichy for eternal use.

From 1924, the library was the main university library of the University of Pécs (previously Elisabeth University of Bratislava) until 2010, when most of the university's collection was migrated to the University Library of Pécs and Centre for Learning. During this period, it was also a special library for political science and jurisprudence. Now the library contains historical documents and items and hosts an exhibition about the history of the university.

== History ==
=== The founder ===
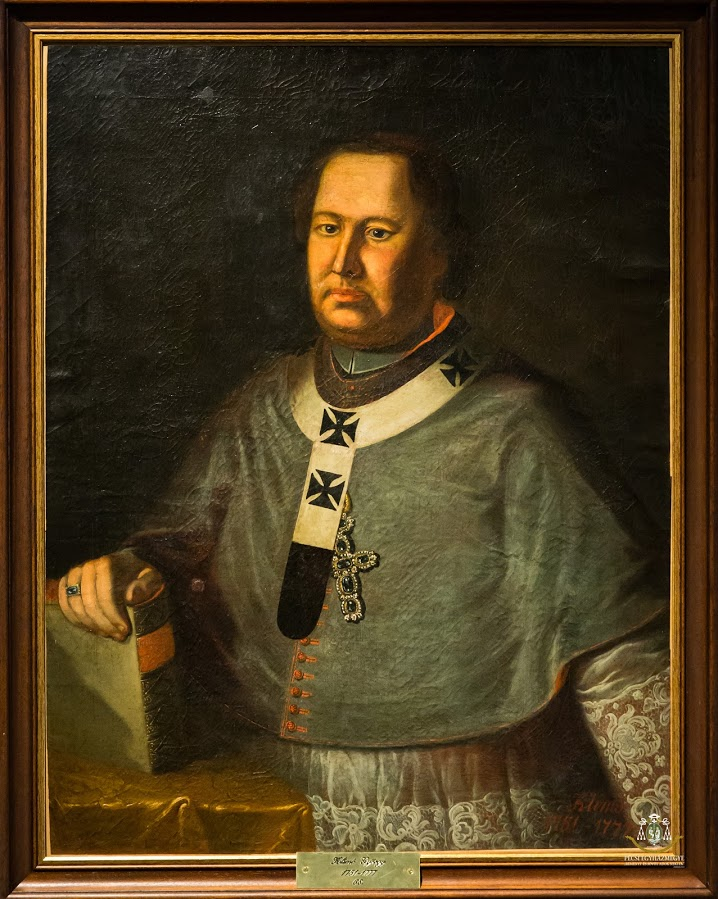
Portrait of Bishop György Klimó

György Klimo was born on 4 April 1710 in Lopassó (Nyitra County, Kingdom of Hungary) . His family name was written as "Klimovicz" in the register. His parents were poor peasants from a serf family. György had one sister Anna, and two brothers, Márton and János. He studied first in Pressburg, then in Buda. On 10 August 1731, he began his studies at the St. Stephen seminary (Szent István Papnevelő Intézet) where he learned theology and liberal arts for two years. During his school period, he suffered a lot from hunger. On 21 March 1733, he was ordained as deacon and on 30 May 1733, Archbishop Imre Esterházy ordained him as priest in Vedrőd.

On 30 July 1751, Maria Theresa selected him to become Bishop of Pécs. He was confirmed on 15 November 1751, and ordained as bishop on 5 March 1752 by Archbishop Franjo Klobusiczky in Pest. After he took his position, Maria Theresa offered him – and his brother (János and Márton), as well as his cousin (Ádám) – a nobiliary title. In 1755, he received the right from Pope Benedict XIV to wear the cardinal’ pallium for his episcopal see. After the death of Archbishop Ferenc Barkóczy in 1765, Maria Theresa offered him the position of Archbishop of Esztergom but Klimó rejected that, referring to his illness as being the cause.

During his term as Bishop of Pécs, and therefore "perpetual count" (ruler and head) of Baranya and Tolna County, Klimó faced to a serious issue in connection with the city of Pécs; the people of Pécs wanted to earn royal free city right for the settlement. Even though – as a serf family descendant – he understood their point of view, he could not free the city because of his episcopal vow. Because of this, he asked for his resignation in 1775 from Pope Pius VI, who declined his request.

Klimó also strongly supported the reformation of education in his episcopal see. From the start of his term (1752) till his death (1777), the number of elementary schools were increased from 72 to 134. In 1769, he requested Maria Theresa’s permission to establish a university in Pécs. Klimó supported many things during his term, such as the music of the episcopal see, literature, poetry and the renovation and decoration of the Cathedral of Pécs. He also established a paper mill to satisfy the country’s needs. György Klimó suffered from an early-recognised illness and he died on 2 May 1777.

=== The foundation of the library ===
The predecessor of György Klimó, Bishop Zsigmond Berényi, who was the head of the episcopal see from 1736 until 1748 had a private library with around 3000 volumes, mostly theological, liturgical, legal and history works. With around a thousand volumes of the Chapter of the Cathedral, also in the same subject, the sum thereof constituted the basis of the library to which Bishop György Klimó added his own collection. After the extension of the episcopal see, a new wing was built for the library. When it was ready in 1774, Klimó opened the library for the public. Journals of that time – such as the Pressburger Zeitung and the Wienerisches Diarium – wrote that the collection of the library contained about 20,000 volumes. Researchers agree that this number was much lower, between 10–15,000 volumes.

He collected books systematically, considering the needs of the faculties of the future university, which was not established in his lifetime. The most important and basic work of every discipline of the 18th century could and can be found in the library. Various fields, such as catholic and protestant theology, history, natural sciences and medicine, mathematics, linguistics and works of contemporary banned authors. Most of these books were purchased in Austria and Italy by his friends and agents. When Bishop Klimó died in 1777, the library had about 15,000 volumes. His successor, Bishop Pál László Esterházy increased the collection of the library, mostly with Hungarian and French contemporary works. Their successors did not take care of the library, no new purchases were made, therefore the institution finished operating as a public library.

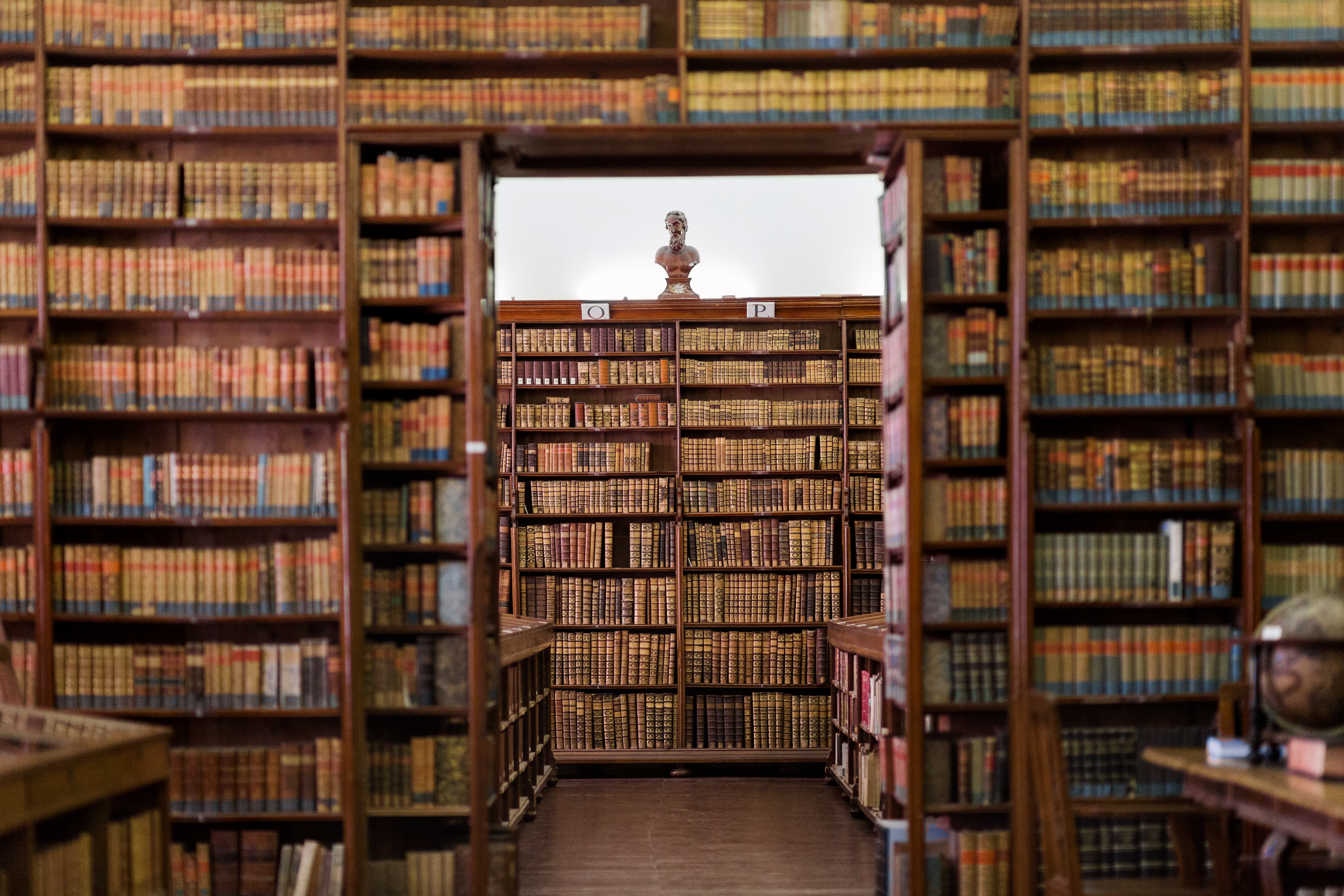
View of the Golden Hall from the Szepesy Hall

After them, Bishop Ignác Szepesy, who was Bishop of Pécs from 1827 until 1838 cared a lot about the library. He is also called the "second founder" thereof, as he continued developing the library, and had it arranged according to the most modern ways of that period. The current classicist building of the library was built in 1830 by József Piacsek after the bishop’s order. The previous collection was merged with Szepesy’s own private collection and it was placed in its present place in 1832. The books were and still are placed in an unusual way, according to their bindings. The most ornate, gold-plated volumes are placed in the Golden Hall ("Aranyterem" in Hungarian), and the works in the white-coloured parchment are placed in the so-called Membrane Hall ("Hártyaterem"). Between these two there is the former ornamental hall, named after Bishop Szepesy ("Szepesy-terem"), in which his collection is located. At that time, the library had around 33,000 volumes. The manuscript catalogues consisting of six folio-volumes were made in the 1830s. They give an alphabetic and classified order of the books for the visitors.

After the death of Szepesy, his successor, Bishop János Scitovszky (from 1838 until 1848), the library was carefully expanded. After that, the library was increased mostly only by presents bequests, mainly by books according to the interest of the priests in the episcopal see.

=== After the Great War as a university library ===
After the First World War and the defeat of the Austro–Hungarian Empire, Pozsony became part of the newly formed Czechoslovakia. In 1923, the Elisabeth University of Bratislava was moved to Pécs. The university’s library started operating in 1915 in Pozsony and after the abolishment of the university, its rich collection (around 65.000 volumes), however, remained in Pozsony. The university settled down in Pécs and its library was placed in the building of the Klimo Library which had been given to the university by Bishop Gyula Zichy. Zichy also gave the university the Klimo Library’s circa 33.000 volumes for eternal use, with the 7000 volumes private collection of the Chapter of the Cathedral as well. The library started operating in the autumn of 1924. In this way, Klimó’s original wish became a reality and his library was finally used by citizens of a university.

Even though the library of the university and the Klimo Collection were in the same building, the collections were placed and used separately. The replacement of the lost collection of the university library was very complicated during the afterwar-period because financial issues. Thanks to many donations from Hungarian and foreign libraries and regular persons, the number of volumes of the university library increased relatively fast. The Hungarian Central Statistical Office’s statistics from 1925 says that the university library had 87.840 volumes at that time. In 1930, this number was 201.599 volumes.

From 1930 until 1934, József Fitz, one of the most prominent figures of the Hungarian librarianship, was the director of the university, who faced serious problems during his term. It is due to him that the modest library of the University of Pécs, during a relatively short time, closed up along with the best working libraries of the country. During his time, around 1400 students were studying at the university and the capacity of the library’s reading room was only 24 people. The library also had only one incomplete and badly organised catalogue. In order to have a reliable survey of the stock of books, a complete revision was needed, and making a catalogue of the whole library was necessary. The successful accomplishment of this work was made possible by expedient utilization of manpower and by some mechanization. The most important tasks to be carried out were the followings:

- enlarging the capacity of the reading room
- the arrangement of the book stocks
- creating new lending rooms and research rooms for university teachers and researchers
- creating a well-arranged catalogue to make surveying of the books easier

He refashioned the ground-floor; enlarging it, and research-rooms with reference-libraries were set up. The university library was operating as a general university library, which meant it collected books in general subjects in order to satisfy the needs of the university’s citizens. From that time onwards, the library also became a nation-wide scientific library, as well as a regional library for South-Transdanubia and a special library for political science and jurisprudence.

The scope of the library’s duties also encompassed the support of the lecturers and students of the university with giving them the necessary documents in connection with their works. In 1974, the stock of the central library had more than 320.000 volumes and more than 35.000 periodicals. At that time, the stock of the library consisted of the following catalogues;

- alphabetical
- subject
- keyword
- geographical
- sequence
- periodical
- periodical article catalogues

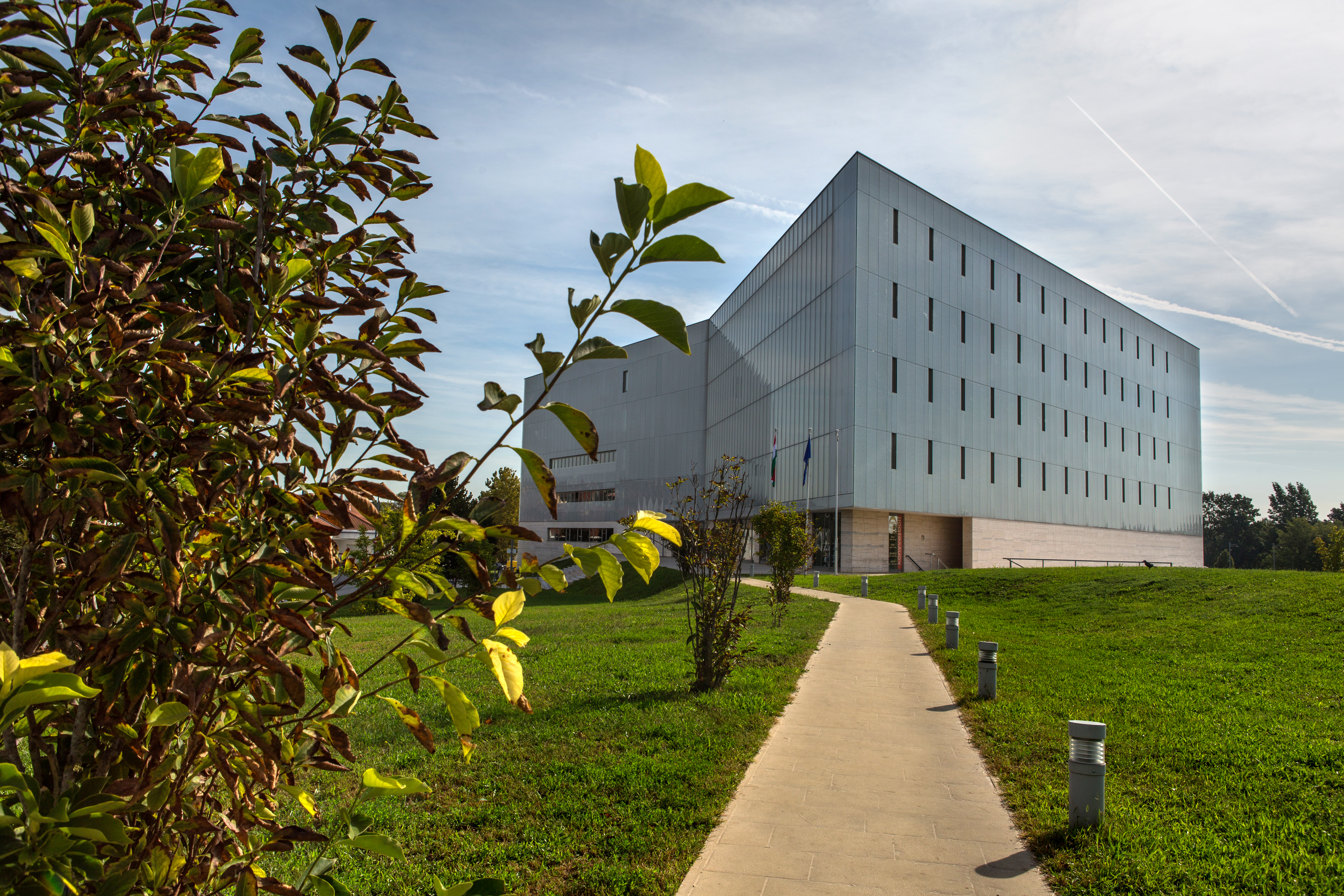
The South Transdanubian Regional Library and Centre for Learning

There was also a so-called "Pannónia" catalogue which contained the special literature referring to Transdanubia. Most of the documents were lendable except the original Klimo Library collection, those manuscripts, curiosities, periodicals and books which had been published before 1850.

In 2010, Pécs was the European Capital of Culture. As part of the program, the City Library of Pécs, the Library of Baranya County and two libraries of the University of Pécs (the Central University Library and the Special Library of University of Pécs for Law and Business and Economics) were moved and integrated into one building – the South Transdanubian Regional Library and Centre for Learning –, which was the fourth biggest library of Hungary at that time. That time, most of the university's collection was migrated from the Klimo Library out as well.

=== Current state of the library ===
Nowadays, the Klimo Library is still an open library, but because of its collection, it is mostly visited by researchers only. It also serves as a museum and home of the University Historical Exhibition. The University Historical Exhibition was opened in 2010. It recalls the gothic style of the medieval university of Pécs and tells us the history of the University of Pécs and its predecessors’.

The library’s collection is accessible via reading rooms only (for the sake of the books’ condition). The digitalised catalogue of the Klimo Library is available online on the booksite of the university. It contains about 15.000 records. In 2001, the catalogue of the Klimo Library was published as a book. Unfortunately, only the first volume was finished which contains only the list of the authors of the collection in alphabetical order.

Most of the books are in Latin with a lot of German and Hungarian tomes. There are also some Italian, Armenian, Russian, Arabic and Sanskrit volumes. The library preserves eight codices, 25 incunabula from the 15th century, 250 antiqua from the 16th century and more than two-hundred old Hungarian prints made before 1711. As part of the Episcopal Collection, there is a globe and a celestial globe which were made in Amsterdam in 1707.

== See also ==
- List of libraries in Hungary

== Sources ==
- "If you are studying in Pécs, you have to see this special library!". lib.pte.hu.
- "Klimo Könyvtár és Egyetemtörténeti Kiállítás". lib.pte.hu (in Hungarian).
- Compiled by Farkas Józsefné and Tamási Mihályné (1974). A 200 éves Klimó Könyvtár és a Pécsi Egyetemi Könyvtár: 1774-1974 (in Hungarian). Pécs: Pécsi Egyetemi Könyvtár.
- Petrovich Ede (1974). A 200 éves Klimó-könyvtár történetéhez (in Hungarian). Budapest: Akadémiai Kiadó.
- Boda Miklós; et al., eds. (2000). A könyv- és könyvtárkultúra ezer éve Baranyában: tanulmányok (in Hungarian). Pécs: Csorba Győző Megyei Könyvtár. ISBN 963-9043-02-8.
- Fényes Miklós (1965). A pécsi Klimo-könyvtár átrendezése az 1930-as években: adalékok a Pécsi Egyetemi Könyvtár történetéhez (in Hungarian). Pécs: Pécsi Egyetemi Könyvtár.
- Fényes Miklós, ed. (1974). Jubileumi évkönyv: 1774-1974 (in Hungarian). Pécs: PTE Állam- és Jogtudományi Kar.
- Pohánka Éva; Szilágyi Mariann, eds. (2011). Klimo György püspök és kora: egyház, művelődés, kultúra a 18. században: a 2010. október 14-én, Pécsett, Klimo György pécsi püspök születésének 300. évfordulójára megrendezett tudományos konferencia tanulmányai (in Hungarian). Pécs: Pécsi Tudományegyetem Egyetemi Könyvtár. ISBN 978-963-642-426-8.
- Liber Margit (1933). Klimo püspök, mint maecenas (in Hungarian). Pécs: Erzsébet Tudományegyetem.
