= Lužická =

Street in Prague, Czech Republic

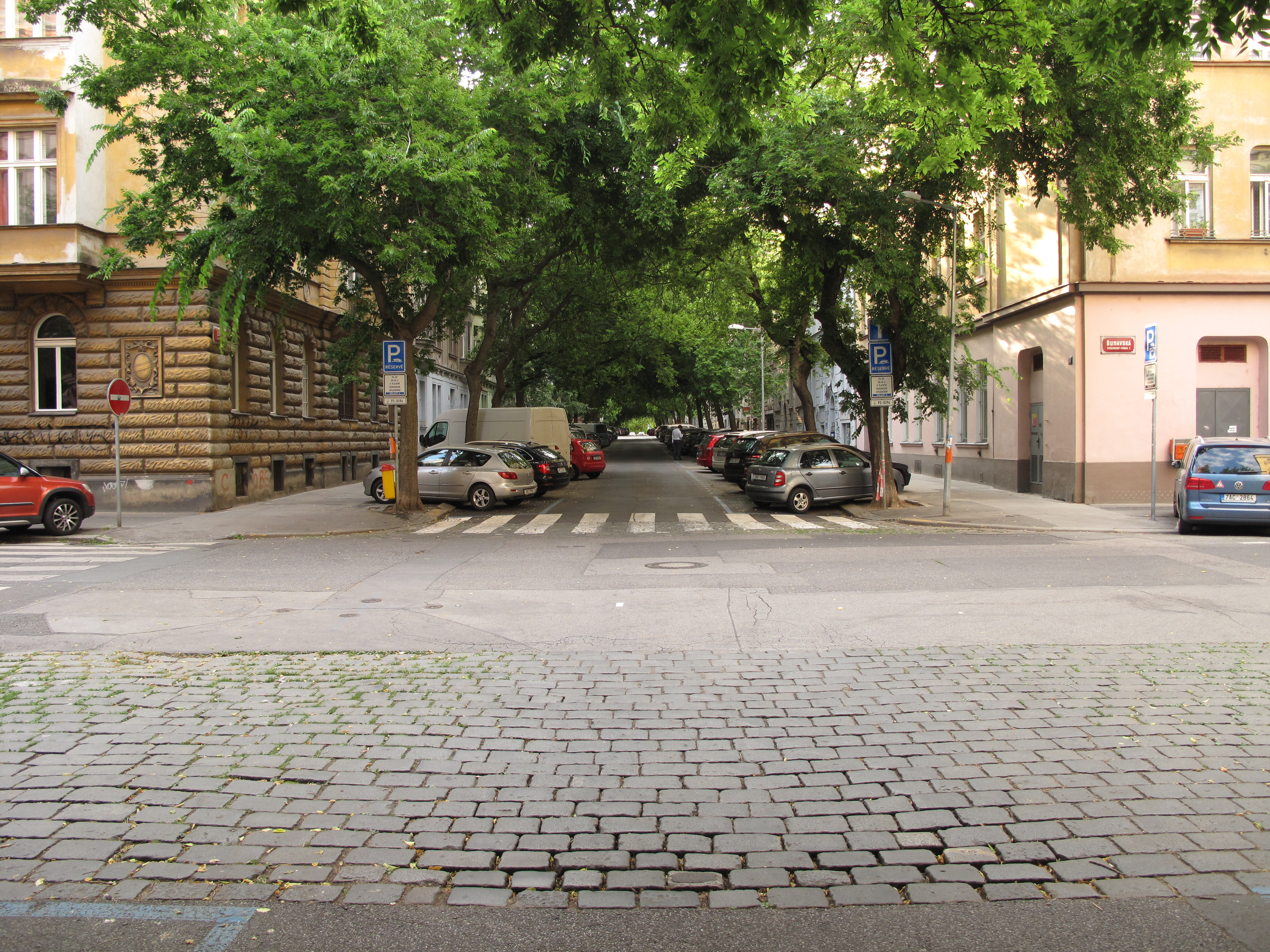
Lužická covered by the canopies of commons hackberry

Lužická is a name of the street in Prague 2, Czech Republic, which connects Budečská Street with Kaldská Street. It is a one way road from Budečská to Kladská. The street starts at Budečská and continues east, slightly uphill. It crosses Šumavská and Chodská and finally ends at Bratří Čapků Park. It continues further, but vehicles cannot proceed, since big concrete barricades were placed there. The street which is behind them is called Hradešínská. The Kladská elementary school is located at the corner of Lužická and Kladská. Violet parking zones are found in the first two blocks. There is a blue parking zone on the last block. The beautiful common hackberry (Celtis occidentalis) lines and shades the entire length of the whole street., Most of the houses date back to the 19th century. The street is named after the Lusatia (in Czech Lužice), region of Germany(that is recognized in historical records). It received its name back around 1900. Between 1940 and 1945 it was called Rankova, during the German occupation Lepold von Ranke. Before the creation of the street fields were found in the area. In 2011 the street was nominated as "Alley of the Year" because of the beautiful and peaceful rows of common hackberry.

== Gallery ==
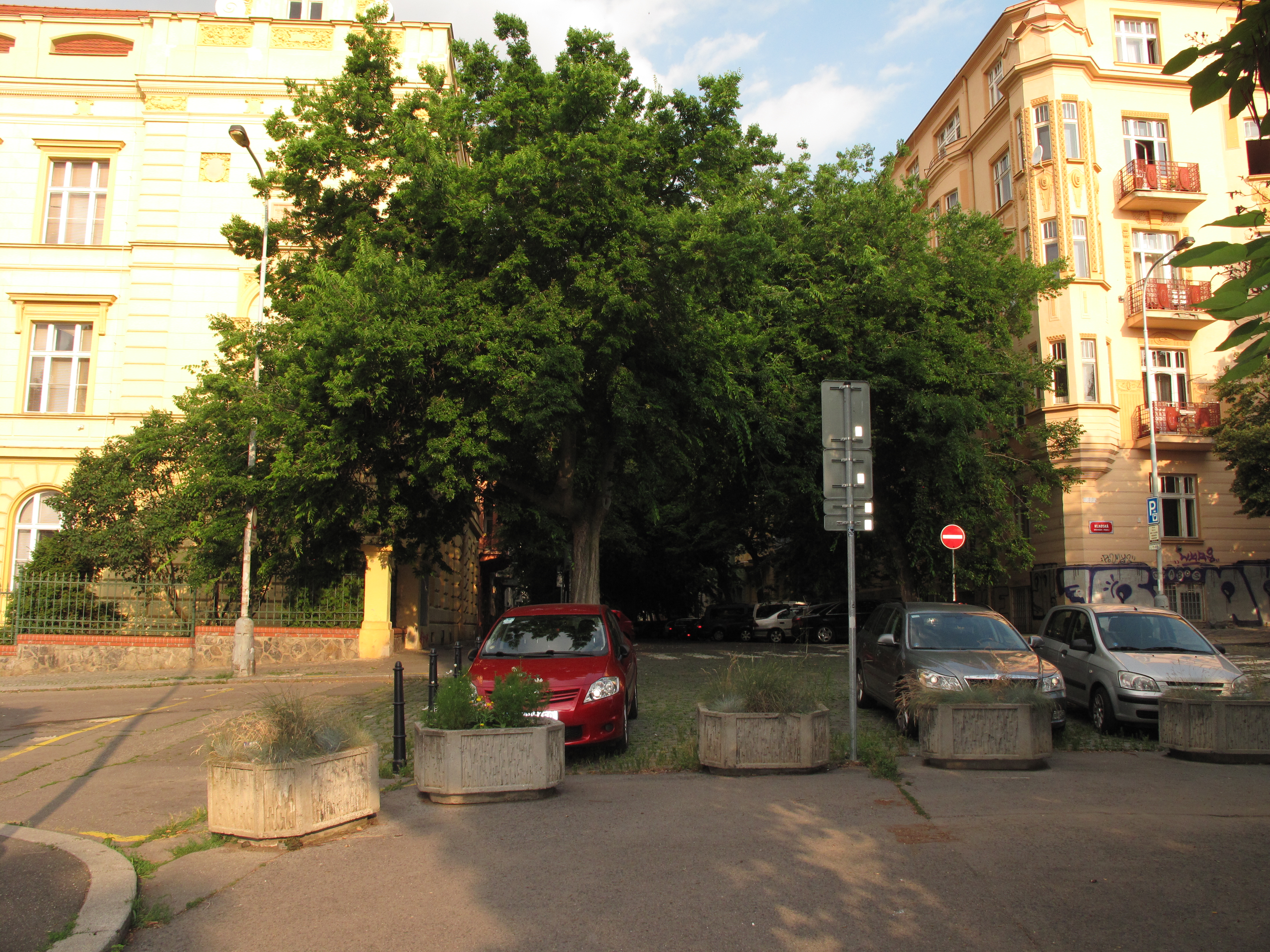
One end of the street is terminated by concrete pots

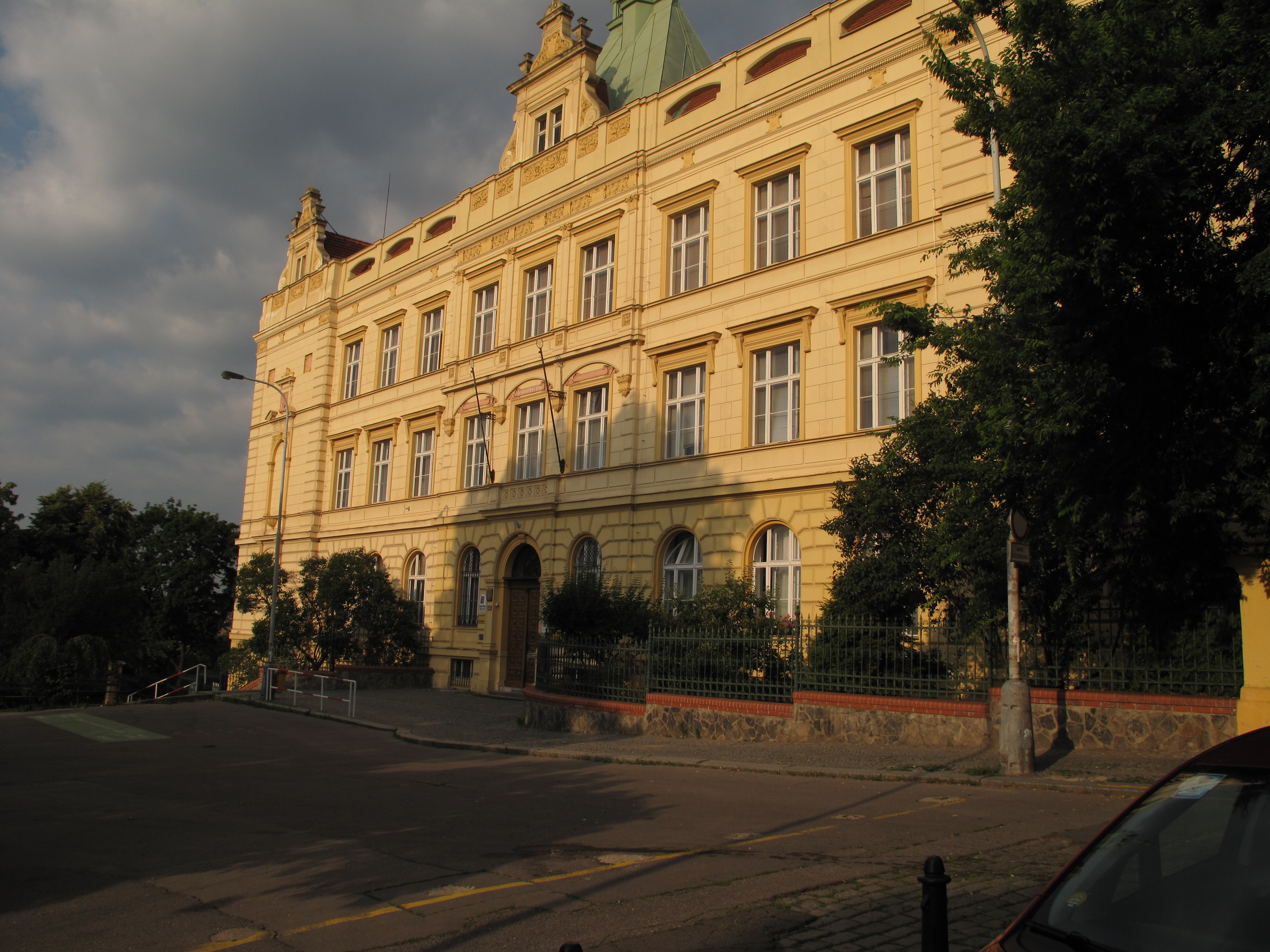
Kladská elementary

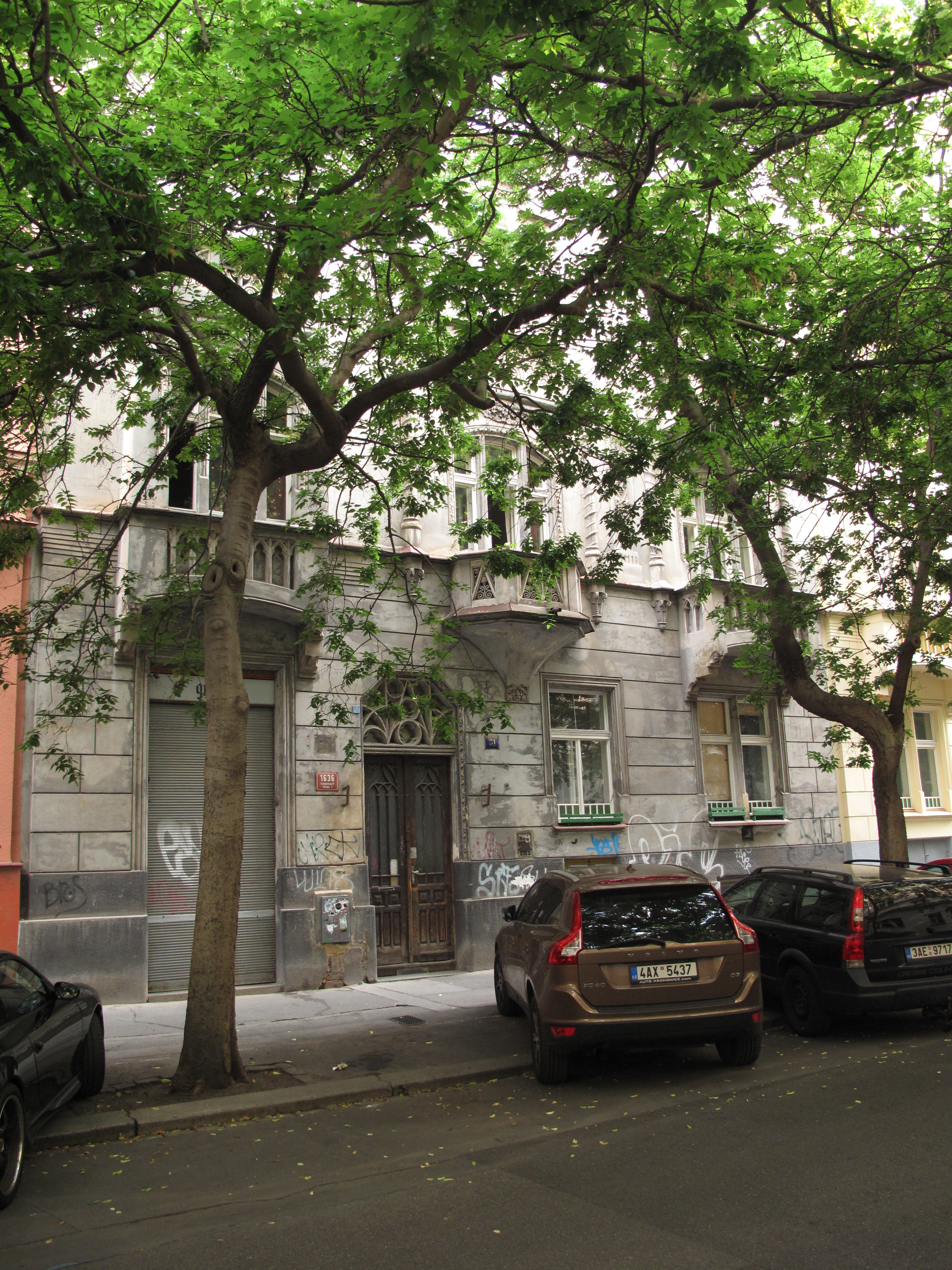
One of the residential house covered by trees
