= György Klimó =

Slovak bishop

- Bishop of Pécs
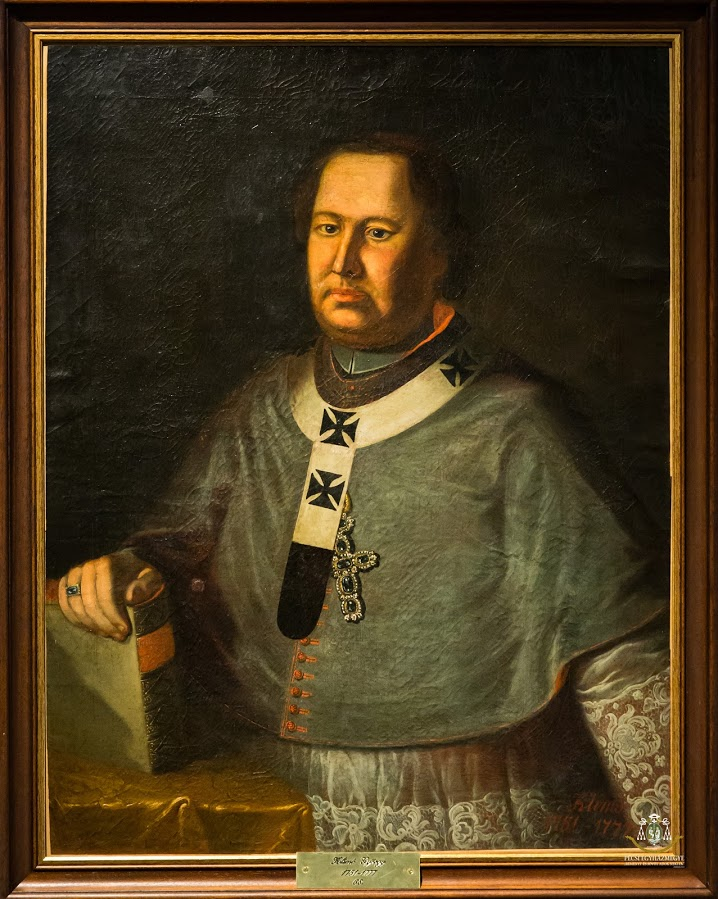
- Church: Roman Catholic Church
- In office: 5 March 1752 - 2 May 1777
- Predecessor: Zsigmond József Berényi

Orders
- Ordination: 30 May 1733

Personal details
- Born: April 4, 1710 Lopassó, Kingdom of Hungary, Habsburg monarchy
- Died: May 2, 1777 Pécs, Kingdom of Hungary, Habsburg monarchy
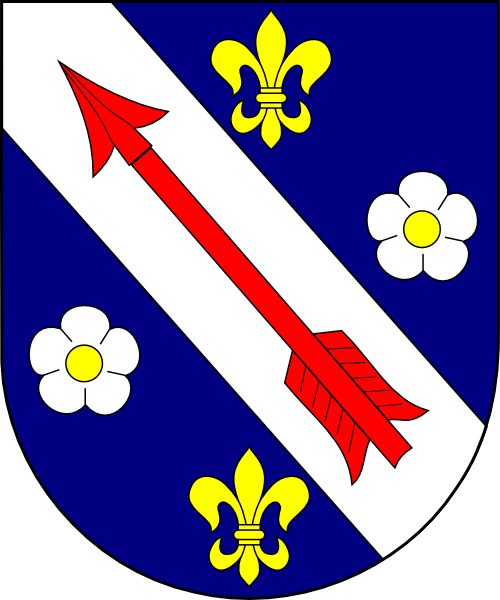
- Coat of arms

György Klimó (4 April 1710 – 2 May 1777) was Bishop of Pécs and founder of the Klimo Library and printing press.

== Biography ==
Klimó came from a serf family. He studied first in Pressburg, then in Pest (present-day Bratislava and Budapest, respectively), and in 1731 began his studies at the St. Stephen seminary (Szent István Papnevelő Intézet). He was ordained to the priesthood in 1733. In 1751 he was appointed Bishop of Pécs (he was ordained as bishop in 1752). In 1769 he sent a request to Maria Theresa to establish a university in Pécs although this was never realised during his lifetime. In 1773 Klimó established the Engel printing house. In 1774 he opened the bishop's library to the public, becoming the first public library in Hungary. The library was initially housed next the bishop's palace but was later moved in 1832 to the library Ignác Szepesy. The library is currently hosted by the University of Pécs in Szepesy Ignác street 1-3. Bishop Klimó also has a street named after him in Pécs.

== Works ==
- Epistola Pastoralis ad Dioecesis Quinque-Ecclesiensis Clerum (1762).
