= Ranke Library =

Library Collection

Coordinates: 43.038426°N 76.135434°W

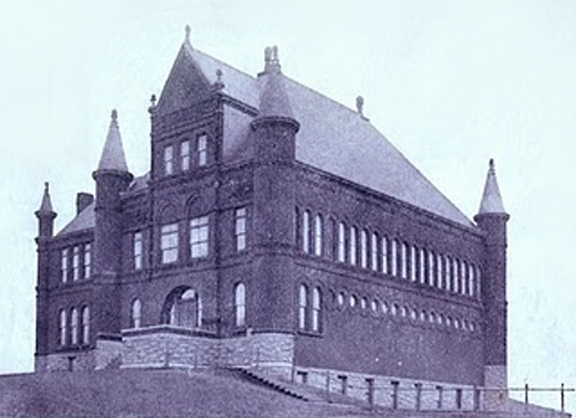
- Location: Tolley Hall, Syracuse University; Syracuse, New York

Collection
- Size: 21,000 items: 17,000 books; 4,000 pamphlets; 430 manuscripts

The Ranke Library was Leopold von Ranke's collection of over 21,000 items. It was purchased by the Syracuse University Library on April 22, 1887, which outbid the Prussian government. The purchase dramatically increased the size of Syracuse University Library, making it the third largest library in New York state. The collection was described as "the finest collection of primary source materials ever assembled by one man for the study of western history".

== Background ==
=== Leopold von Ranke ===
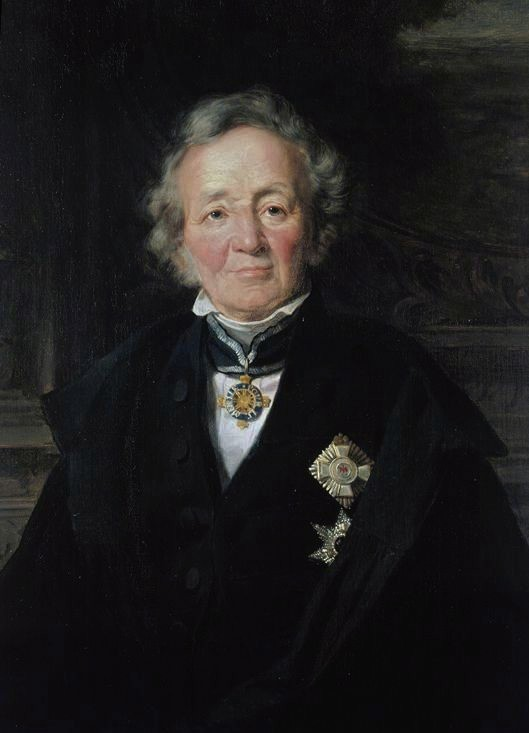
Leopold von Ranke

Leopold von Ranke (21 December 1795 – 23 May 1886) was a German historian and a founder of modern source-based history. According to Caroline Hoefferle, "Ranke was probably the most important historian to shape [the] historical profession as it emerged in Europe and the United States in the late 19th century." He was able to implement the seminar teaching method in his classroom and focused on archival research and analysis of historical documents. Building on the methods of the Göttingen school of history, Ranke set the standards for much of later historical writing.

=== Syracuse University Library ===
Syracuse University had few books when classes began in 1871, and the library's collection was held in temporary housing. By 1875, the library still held only 2,300 items. Until 1888, the library spent an average of $26 a year on purchasing items, and largely grew only due to donations.

== Collection ==
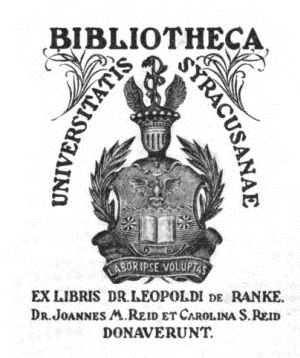
Syracuse University von Ranke bookplate

The collection consists of around 17,000 books, 4,000 pamphlets and 430 manuscripts. In 1984, it was valued at around $3 million (equivalent to $9.3 million in 2025). It includes a first edition of Martin Luther's Table Talk, The Libellus of Telesphorus of Cosenza, a first edition copy of The Autobiography of Benjamin Franklin (in French), Institutes of the Christian Religion, several volumes of Mercurius Gallobelgicus, a pamphlet written by Thomas Müntzer, Ludovico Antonio Muratori's Rerum Italicarum scriptores, Giovanni Domenico Mansi's Sacrorum conciliorum, the Corpus Inscriptionum Latinarum, and extensive personal memoirs of Ranke. The collection has a large number of Venetian documents. Upon its purchase by Syracuse in 1887, The New York Times described the collection as "probably the rarest historical one ever owned by any one in the world".

== History ==
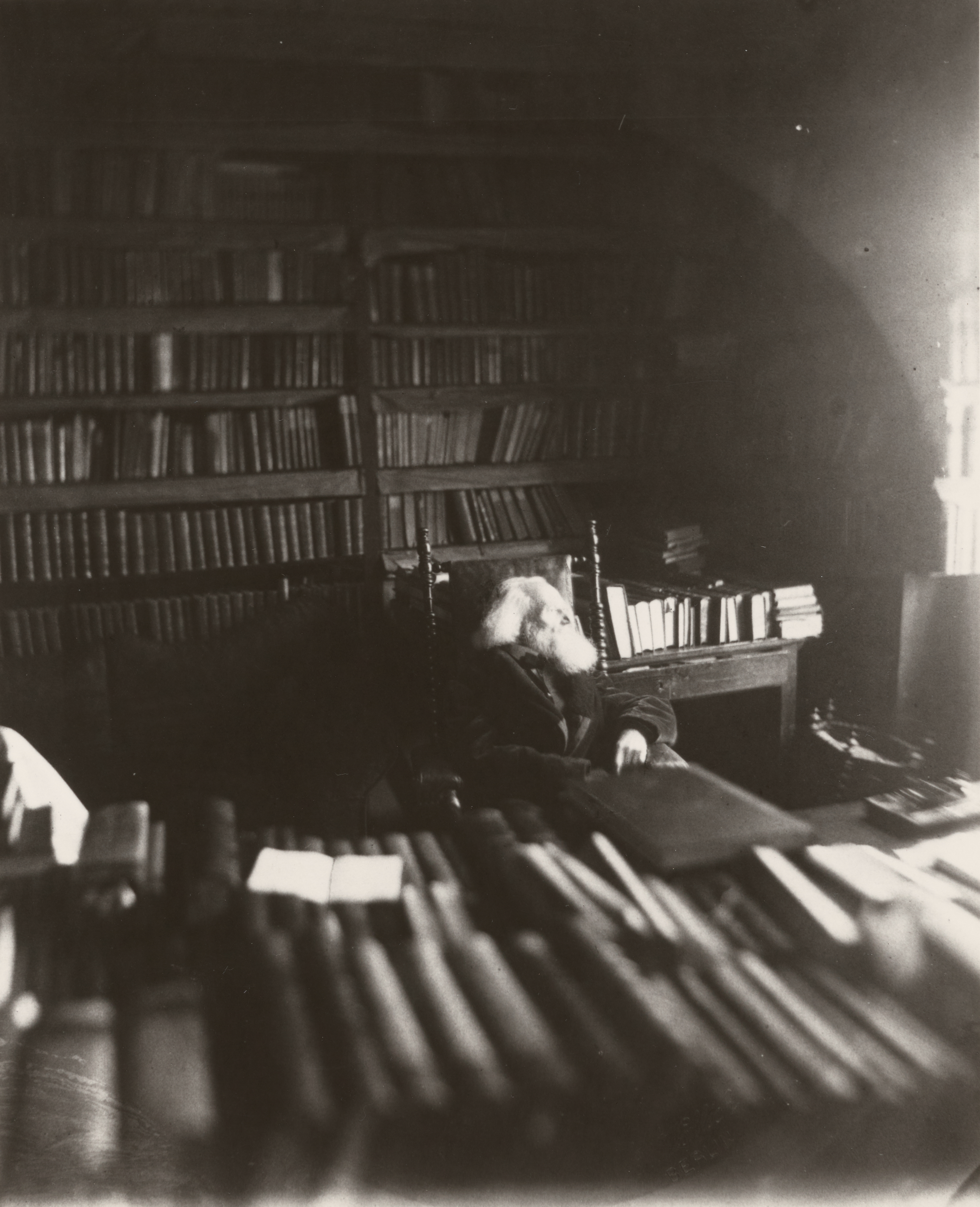
Leopold von Ranke in his library, early 1880s.

In 1875, a wealthy cleric, John Morrison Reid, was convinced by Syracuse University librarian Charles W. Bennett of the necessity to purchase more books for the library. Reid soon donated $5,000 towards the purchase of additional books by the library. While on a trip to Europe, Bennett learned that the Ranke library would soon become available for purchase. He soon communicated his desire to Reid that the library purchase the collection when it was put up for sale. At least six university libraries, including Cornell, Harvard and Yale also considered purchasing the collection. When Ranke died in 1886, it was largely expected that the Prussian government would purchase the collection.

Upon the purchase of the collection, the Chicago Tribune wrote:

The recent purchase of the great historical library of Dr. Leopold von Ranke by an American suggests some reflections. There is no doubt that this library, which numbers many thousands of books, pamphlets, manuscripts and documents of all times and all languages, is the finest historical collection in the world.... But this great and invaluable collection, which should have gone to one of the large cities like New York, Boston, Philadelphia or Chicago, or to one of the university towns like Cambridge, New Haven, Ithaca or Ann Arbor, is going to Syracuse, which is neither a large city nor a university town, but a place principally devoted to the manufacture of salt and the supply of provisions to through railroad travellers. The question immediately arises: What do the Syracuse salt boilers want of von Ranke's historical library? Had it been a collection of saline treatises, the purchase might have been understood.

In an effort to secure the collection for Syracuse, Bennett contacted the oldest son of Ranke, Otto von Ranke. He gave Bennett first refusal if the Prussian government turned the library down. Leopold von Ranke's family requested that the collection was to remain in one place and they receive a fair price for it. In summer 1886, Bennett traveled to Germany to negotiate the purchase. After months of negotiating with the Prussians, who made unsatisfactory offers and proposed dividing the collection, in March 1887, Bennett informed the family that Syracuse University would respect their wishes if they made a decision within the next two weeks. The collection was successfully purchased for around $20,000, donated by Reid, and shipped in 83 crates weighing 19 tons. It arrived in March 1888, and construction began on a building to house the collection the following year.

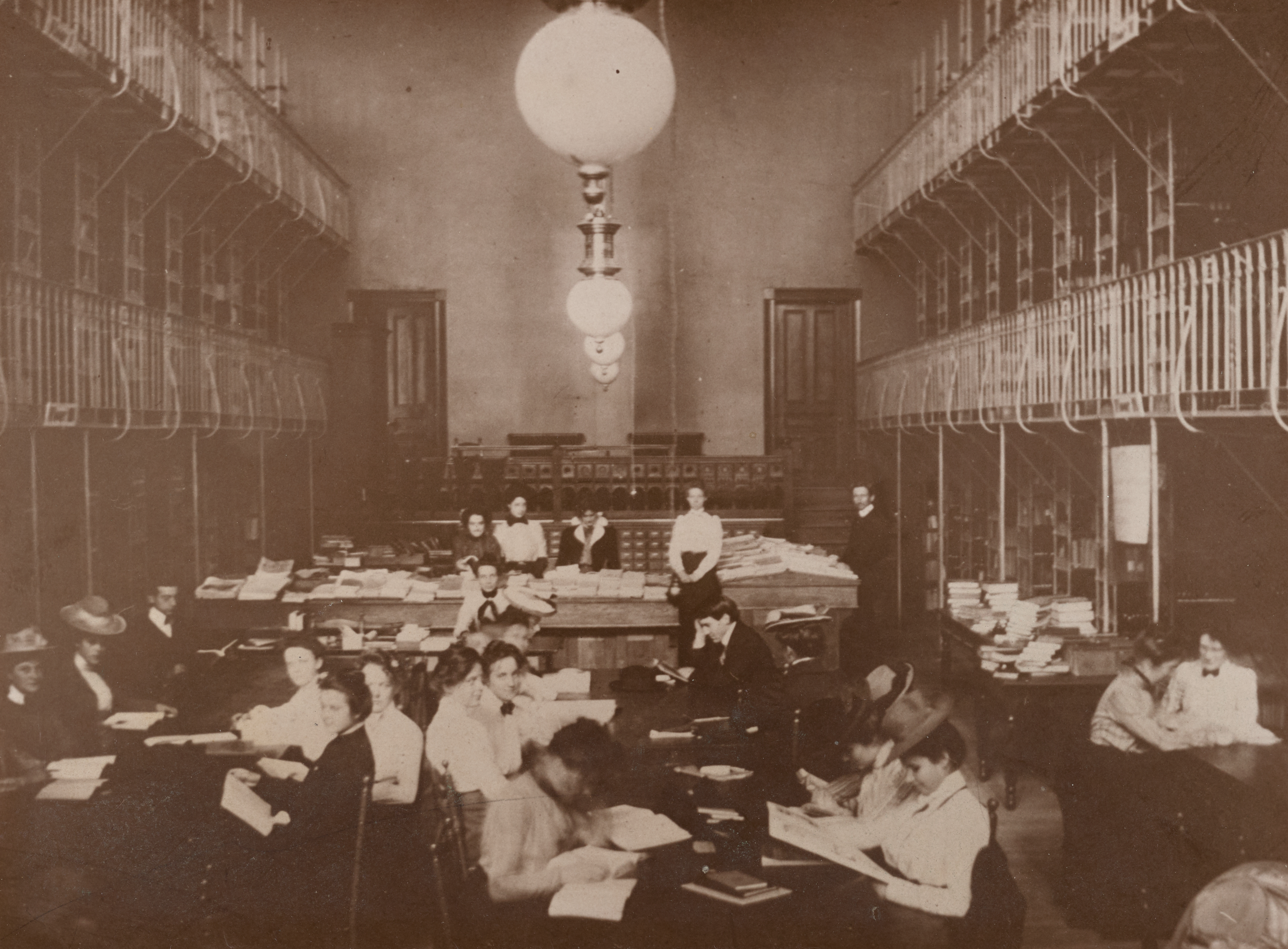
Von Ranke Library Interiors c. 1900.

Work soon began to slow down as funding for the university as a whole slowly declined. Cataloging efforts were slow and inconsistent. In 1895, with the introduction of Dewey Decimal Classification, cataloging restarted. In 1937, the director of the library considered the collection "chiefly sentimental". By the 1950s, the collection was housed at the top of the Syracuse University Carnegie Library and was poorly maintained and cataloged. In the 1960s, professor James Powell began efforts to better maintain the collection. In 1977, the National Endowment for the Humanities granted the library $50,000 and matched an additional $50,000 raised from private sources for restoration of the collection. More than one hundred volumes of the Monumenta Germaniae Historica were donated by the Deutsche Forschungsgemeinschaft. The library soon began working on "restoration, cataloging of the main collection and cataloging of the original manuscripts". Edward Muir was hired to catalog the manuscripts. In 1983, the complete manuscript catalog was published, and by 1984 the collection had been 80% cataloged.

== Sources ==
- Hoeft, Bernhard (1937). Das Schicksal der Ranke-Bibliothek (in German). Verlag dr. Emil Ebering.
