= Edward Wallace Muir Jr. =

American historian (born 1946)

Edward Wallace Muir Jr. (born 1946) is a professor of history and Italian at Northwestern University. He is also Clarence L. Ver Steeg Professor in the Arts and Sciences and Charles Deering McCormick Professor of Teaching Excellence. Known for his use of anthropological methods in historical research, he was a pioneer in the historical study of ritual and feuding. He has been especially influential in using and interpreting microhistorical methods, which were first devised by historians in Italy. His work has focused on Renaissance Italy, especially the Republic of Venice and its territories. He served as president of the American Historical Association in 2023.

== Family ==
Muir was raised in Salt Lake City, Utah, and is the descendant of early Mormon pioneers. His great grandfather, William Smith Muir, served in the Mormon Battalion during the War with Mexico and as a sergeant in the U.S. Army raised the first American flag over San Diego, California. William Smith later settled in Bountiful, Utah where he began to farm in 1852. His descendants used the farm in Bountiful as the nucleus for a shipping and packing business for fresh produce from Utah, Oregon, Idaho, and Nevada. Muir's father, Edward Wallace Muir Sr., was the long-serving president of the company, then known as Muir-Roberts, Co., Inc. Muir's brother, Phillip R. Muir, serves as the fifth-generation president of the company, now known as Muir Copper Canyon Farms, which is a food service provider for restaurants and institutions in Utah, Idaho, and Wyoming. Muir's maternal grandfather, Samuel Morgan, was the superintendent of schools in Davis County, Utah. Muir's mother, Mary Margaret Muir, was an art historian who taught at the University of Utah and was an expert on the noted western landscape painter, LeConte Stewart.

== Life and career ==
Muir studied history at the University of Utah (BA 1969) and Modern European History at Rutgers University in New Brunswick, New Jersey (MA 1970, PhD 1975). He has taught at Stockton State College in New Jersey, Syracuse University, Louisiana State University, and Northwestern University, where he served as department chair. He has lived and conducted research for extended periods in Florence, Venice, and Rome, Italy. He is the past president of the Sixteenth Century Society and Conference (2004) and from 2012 to 2014 was president of the Renaissance Society of America. He has been elected to serve as the president of the American Historical Association in 2023.

He has held fellowships from among others the Guggenheim Foundation, the Institute for Advanced Study in Princeton, the National Humanities Center, and the Center for Advanced Study in the Behavioral Sciences in Stanford. In 2010, he received the Distinguished Achievement Award from the Andrew W. Mellon Foundation, currently the largest award in the humanities. In 2014 he became a Fellow of the American Academy of Arts and Sciences.

Throughout his career his work has rotated around two problems, the means for establishing a civil society in late medieval and Renaissance Italy, especially through ritual, and the forces of disorder working against civil society, especially vendettas. Although rooted in an analysis of the social structures of cities and networks of patrons and families, most of his work has engaged the interpretation of meaning through public representations, whether in civic rituals, carnival festivity, or operas.

He is an avid skier.

== Works ==
- Civic Ritual in Renaissance Venice (Princeton University Press, 1981) (Winner of the Herbert Baxter Adams Prize and Howard R. Marraro Prize in Italian History)
- Italian translation: Il rituale civico a Venezia nel Rinascimento (Rome: Il Veltro Editrice, 1984).
- The Leopold von Ranke Manuscript Collection of Syracuse University: The Complete Catalogue (Syracuse University Press, 1983).
- Sex and Gender in Historical Perspective. Co-edited with Guido Ruggiero. Selections from Quaderni Storici, no. 1. Baltimore: The Johns Hopkins University Press, 1990.
- Microhistory and the Lost Peoples of Europe. Co-edited with Guido Ruggiero. Selections from Quaderni Storici, no. 2. Baltimore: The Johns Hopkins University Press, 1991.
- Mad Blood Stirring: Vendetta and Factions in Friuli during the Renaissance. Baltimore: The Johns Hopkins University Press, 1993, 390pp. (Winner of the Howard R. Marraro Prize in Italian History)
- Reader's edition: Mad Blood Stirring: Vendetta in Renaissance Italy. Baltimore: The Johns Hopkins University Press, 1998.
- Italian translation: Il sangue s’infuria e ribolle: La vendetta nell’Italia del Rinascimento. Verona: Cierre edizioni, 2010.
- History from Crime. Co-edited with Guido Ruggiero. Selections from Quaderni Storici, no. 3. Baltimore: The Johns Hopkins University Press, 1994, 236pp.
- Ritual in Early Modern Europe (Cambridge University Press, 1997, 2nd edition, 2005).
- Italian translation: Riti e rituali nell’Europa moderna. Milan, La Nuova Italia, 2000.
- Spanish translation: Fiesta y rito en la Europa moderna. Madrid, Editorial Complutense, 2001.
- Co-author with Brian Levack, Michael Maas, and Meredith Veldman, The West: Encounters and Transformations. New York: Addison Wesley Longman (new Prentice Hall), 2004. Concise edition, 2006. 2nd full edition, 2007. 3rd full edition, 2010.
- The Culture Wars of the Late Renaissance: Skeptics, Libertines, and Opera. Cambridge, Mass.: Harvard University Press, 2007.
- Italian translation: Guerre culturali: Libertinismo e religione alla fine del Rinascimento. Bari: Laterza, 2008.
