= Public Library (Budapest) =

Feminist library and Community space in Budapest

- Közkincs Könyvtár
- 47.494893°N 19.063117°E
- Location: Rákóczi út 11, Budapest, Hungary
- Type: Special library
- Established: 2015

Collection
- Size: 15,000 volume (2023)

Közkincs Könyvtár (Hungarian pronunciation: [ˈkøskint͡ʃ ˈkøɲftaːr]; transl. Public Library) is a feminist library and community space in Budapest. The library's collection is primarily composed of English-language works in the categories of fiction, poetry, art, and sociology, with a heavy emphasis on topics of race, gender and class.

== Other activities ==
The library also hosts community events, lectures, workshops and various projects.

== See also ==
- List of libraries in Hungary
