= Friedrich Curschmann =

German composer and singer (1805–1841)

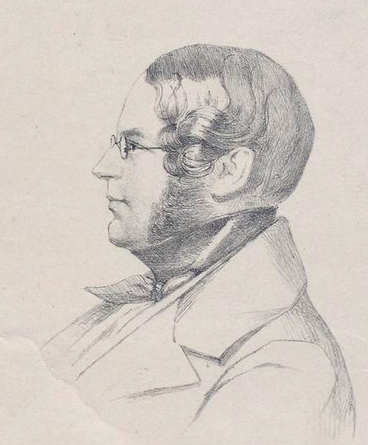
- Friedrich Curschmann by Adolf Jebens

Background information
- Born: June 21, 1805
- Died: August 24, 1841 (aged 36)
- Genres: Classical
- Instruments: Composer; singer

Karl Friedrich Curschmann (June 21, 1805 – August 24, 1841) was a German song composer and singer.

== Life ==
Curschmann was born in 1805, in Berlin. His talent for singing was discovered when he was at school. In 1824, having been a law student in Berlin and Göttingen, he started to devote his life to music. He went to Kassel where he studied under Spohr and Hauptmann, starting with church music. At Kassel in 1828 he wrote his first opera Abdul und Errinieh oder Toten.

After four years in Kassel, Curschmann returned to Berlin. After 1837 he lived with Rose Behrend, daughter of a Danzig businessman and herself a singer, before they married and engaged heavily in the musical life of Berlin. He befriended Eduard Grell, director of the Berlin Song Academy.

Curschmann wrote 83 songs, many to the poems of Goethe, Schiller, Heine and Rückert.

Curschmann died in Langfuhr, near Danzig, in 1841.

== Compositions ==
=== Books of songs ===
- Wiegenlied
- Die Stillen Wanderer
- Der Abend Standchen
- Der Fischer Altes Volkslied
- Jagerlied
- Au Rose der Schiffer
- Der kleine Hans

=== Opera ===
- Abdul und Errinieh oder Toten
