= Clarissa von Ranke =

Irish poet and salon host

- Born: Clarissa Helena Graves; 8 April 1808; Dublin, Ireland
- Died: 30 April 1871 (aged 63); Berlin, Germany
- Spouse: Leopold von Ranke

Clarissa "Clara" von Ranke (8 April 1808 – 30 April 1871) was an Irish poet and salon host.

== Life and family ==
Clarissa von Ranke was born Clarissa Helena Graves in Dublin in 1808. She was the elder daughter of chief police magistrate of Dublin, John Crosbie Graves (1776–1835), and Helena, daughter of the Rev. Charles Perceval. The family live at 12 Fitzwilliam Square. Her brothers were John Thomas Graves a lecturer in mathematics at University College, London, Robert Perceval Graves a founder of Alexandra College, Dublin, and the Rt Rev. Charles Graves bishop of Limerick. Ranke was educated in England and Europe, having a talent for languages, literature, and music, but poetry in particular. Following the death of her father, Ranke travelled across Europe with her mother.

She met German historian Leopold Ranke in Paris in July 1843. They were engaged in London, and married in October 1843 at Bowness-on-Windermere, England. The couple had three sons, one of whom died in infancy, and one daughter. The son of her brother Charles, Alfred Perceval Graves, married her great-grand-niece Amelie Elisabeth Sophie von Ranke. Her husband was later ennobled and the family name became "von Ranke".

== Life in Berlin ==
The Rankes moved to Berlin after their marriage, living on Luisenstraße, hosting a wide social circle at "Salon Ranke". Their salon hosted professionals from around the world, hosting classes in literature and poetry, discussions on history and politics, and musical parties. Among the regular attendees were August Wilhelm Schlegel, Lord Francis Napier, Sir Andrew Buchanan, Friedrich Wilhelm Joseph Schelling, and the Brothers Grimm. The salon was viewed as conservative, but discussions included a range of topics from cultural exchange, nation building in Ireland and beyond, the position of women in society, to the role of religion in society.

Ranke maintained a keen interest in Ireland, writing to her brother Robert in 1846 about the threat of an Irish famine she noted "You all eat too much in England and will in the end starve your poorer neighbours." When writing to Julia Garnett Pertz, the wife of a German historian, Ranke displays and interest in emancipation of slaves and social reform, as well as advocating for the education of women. She gave classes in English, French and Italian, as well as taking part in piano competitions with Felix Mendelssohn. Ranke was fluent in ten languages, and was knowledgeable of 20. A published poet, Ranke's poems appeared in Thomas Solly's Coronal of English verse (Berlin, 1864) and Main's Treasury of English sonnets (1880). She assisted her husband with his historical work for almost 30 years. She secured him a competent English translator, and sometimes translated his work herself for comparative purposes. In 1869, She welcomed the disestablishment of the Church of Ireland, sharing a hope with her brother Robert that Protestants and Catholics could co-exist peacefully.

Ranke suffered with poor health for a number of years, which resulted in her developing an interest in nursing and medical issues. She met Florence Nightingale, and became involved in programmes assisting wounded soldiers. She died in Berlin on 20 April 1871, and is buried at Friedhof II der Sophiengemeinde Berlin.
