= Adolf Jebens =

German painter (1819–1888)

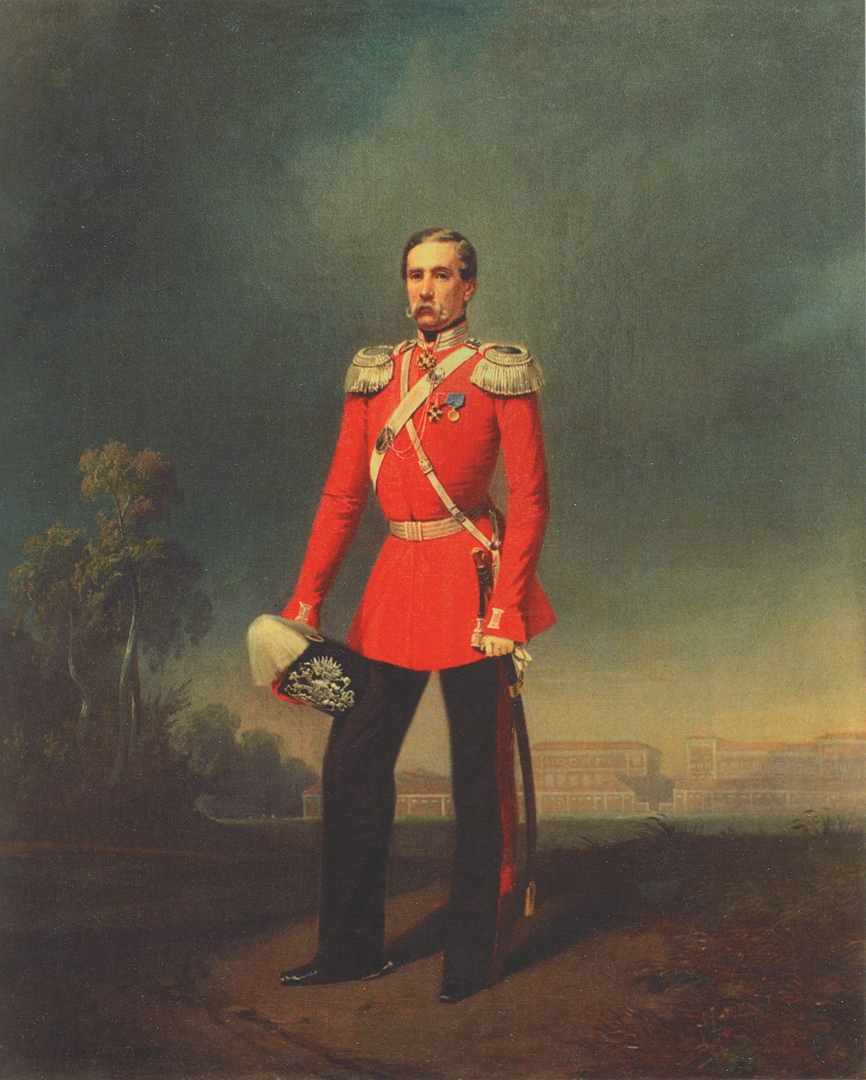
Ilya Vasilievich Denisov, by Adolf Jebens, 1857.

Adolf Jebens (19 March 1819 – 8 May 1888) was a German painter, best remembered for his portraits of Leopold von Ranke and Friedrich Curschmann. He trained at the Köllnisches Gymnasium, the Prussian Academy of Arts, and the Beaux-Arts de Paris. His works are in the collections of the Märkisches Museum, and he was a member of the Russian Academy of Arts.
