= Archives of the Serbian Orthodox Church =

Ecclesiastical archives

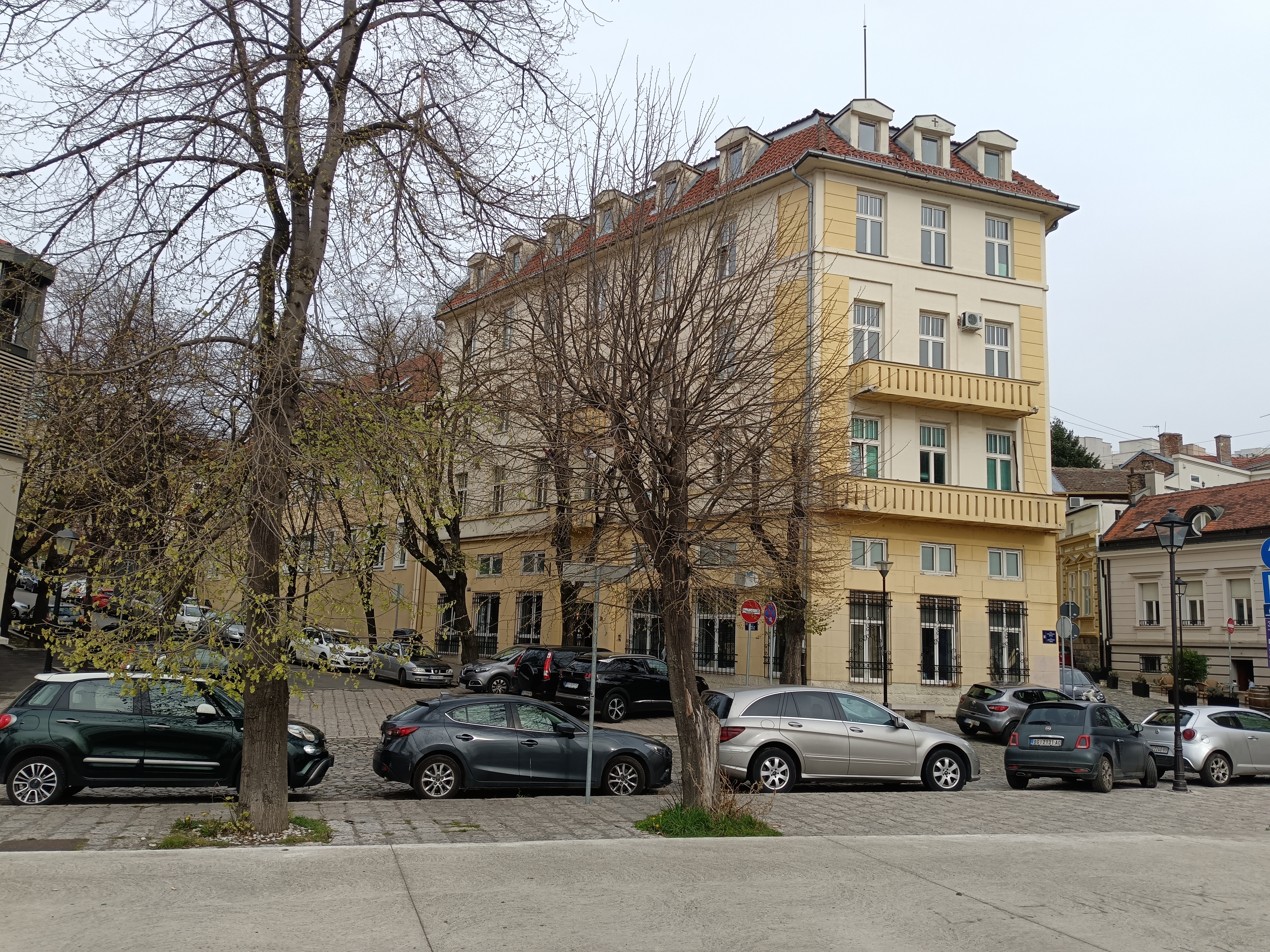
- Archives building
- 44°49′01″N 20°27′05″E
- Location: Kralja Petra Street 2, Belgrade, Serbia
- Type: Ecclesiastical archives
- Established: 1920

Other information
- Director: Radovan Pilipović
- Parent organization: Serbian Orthodox Church
- Website: Official website

The Archives of the Serbian Orthodox Church (Serbian: Архив Српске православне цркве, romanized: Arhiv Srpske pravoslavne crkve) is the central repository archives of the Serbian Orthodox Church, located in Belgrade, Serbia.

== History ==
The archives developed on the foundations of the central archives of the Metropolitanate of Belgrade after the 1920 reunification of the Patriarchate of Karlovci in the Habsburg monarchy, the Metropolitanate of Belgrade in the Kingdom of Serbia, and the Metropolitanate of Montenegro in the Principality of Montenegro into single Serbian Orthodox Church within the newly established Kingdom of Serbs, Croats, and Slovenes.

The archives primarily contain important documents from the early 19th century onwards crucial for understanding the ecclesiastical and secular history. The archives receive support in their work from the Ministry of Culture and the Directorate for Cooperation with Churches and Religious Communities. The archives in their current form of an independent institution were developed only in 2007 and the agreement between the Church with the Ministry of Culture and the State Archives of Serbia which ensured personnel and appropriate staff to manage archival work missing within the church hierarchy.

The archival materials were initially kept at the residence of the Archbishop of Serbia and Metropolitan of Belgrade until 1935 when they were transferred to the present location. The central facility hold just a fraction of the total collection of the archives, which spans two to three kilometres in length. Remaining archival collection was moved from the Palace of the Patriarchate to the gallery of the Church of Saint Mark in 1989. The unprofessional transport of the archives led to many items being scattered, and some documents disappeared without a trace. For nearly two and a half decades, the valuable archives, which provide insights into the ecclesiastical, social, demographic, diplomatic, and political history of modern Serbia and Serb people in neighbouring countries, remained in dust, neglected and uncared for motivating state institutions to get involved. The formal agreement was signed in 2007 between the Serbian Orthodox Church and the Minister of Culture and the State Archives of Serbia, Miroslav Perišić. In 2019, this material was moved from the Church of Saint Mark to the newly reconstructed Svetosavski dom building in Zemun.

== See also ==
- List of archives in Serbia
- Archives of Sremski Karlovci
- Archives of the Eparchy of Buda
