= Archives of the Eparchy of Buda =

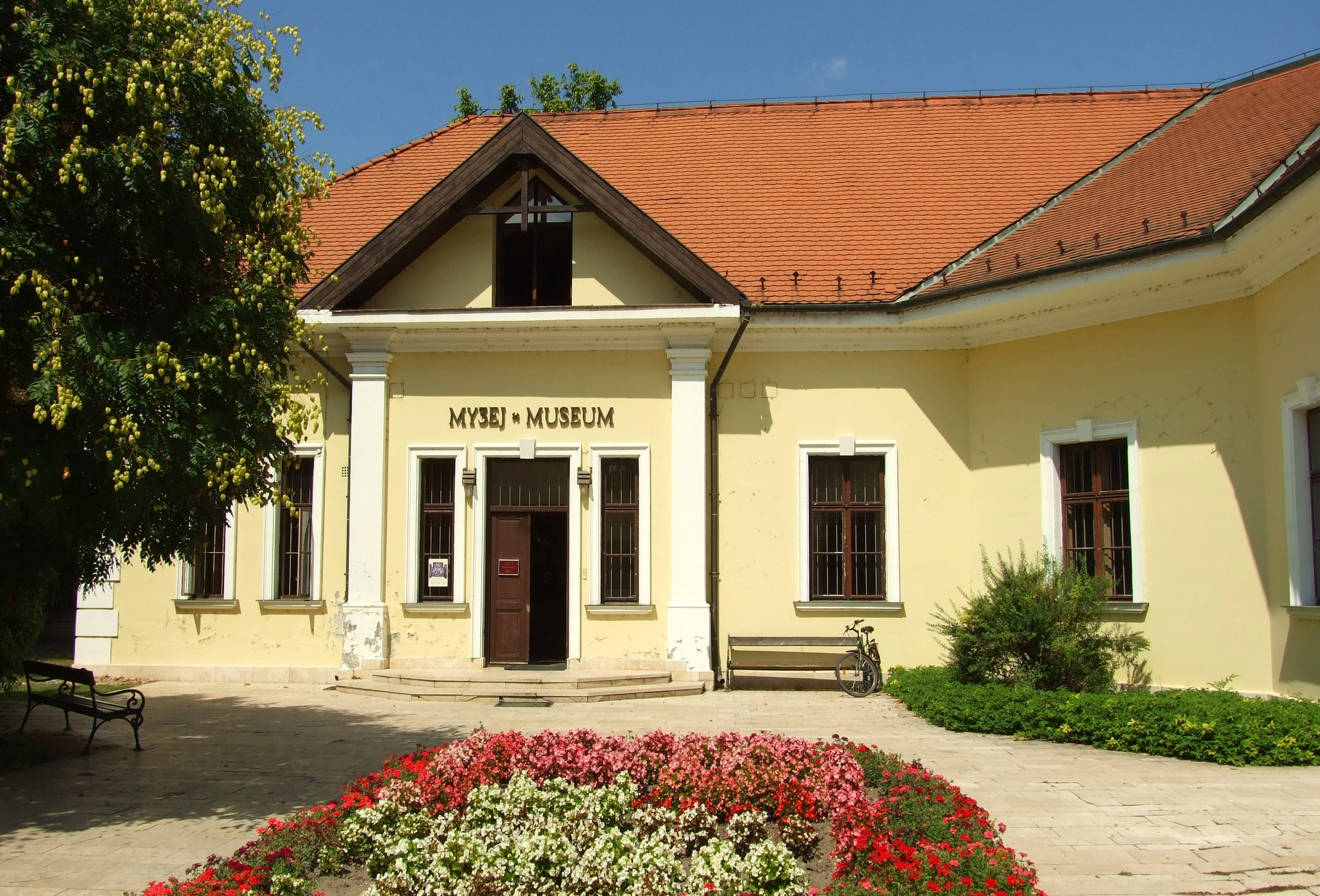
- The building housing the archives, museum, and the library
- 47°40′09″N 19°04′32″E
- Location: Pátriárka utca 5, Szentendre, Pest County, Hungary
- Type: Diocese archives

Other information
- Website: semu.hu

The Archives of the Eparchy of Buda (Serbian: Архив епархије будимске, romanized: Arhiv eparhije budimske; Hungarian: A Budai Egyházmegye Levéltára) in Szentendre, Hungary, are the central repository archives of the Eparchy of Buda of the Serbian Orthodox Church. They are considered by some commentators to be one of the most important Serb cultural institutions outside of Serbia.

The archives house collections in approximately 1,700 boxes. The archival materials are organized into various fonds, including administrative, societal, and personal collections. Notably, significant collections include parish registers from 56 churches covering 1725 to 1975, which were digitized in 2011, and a collection of 1,500 inventories from churches and monasteries.

== History ==
The initiative to professionally gather, protect, and organize the archival materials of the Eparchy of Buda began in 1970 at a meeting in the State Archives of Serbia, attended by prominent scholars. The project officially commenced in 1984, following the signing of the cultural cooperation agreement between SFR Yugoslavia and Hungarian People's Republic. The wider project at the time aimed to preserve records from three important Serb institutions abroad: the Serbian Church Community in Trieste, the Hilandar Monastery on Mount Athos, and the Eparchy of Buda in Szentendre.

The archives in Szentendre officially began operations in 1990, coinciding with the tricentennial of the Great Migration of the Serbs. The Yugoslav Wars in 1991 disrupted this cooperation, but since 1993, with funding from the Buda Eparchy and the Ministry of Culture of Serbia, experts from the State Archives of Serbia have resumed their work in Szentendre.

Although not fully open to the general public, the archives attract significant interest from researchers, historians, and genealogists from Hungary, Serbia, and from other countries. The digitization of key collections and the development of informative guides and catalogues have enhanced the archive's accessibility, allowing for more systematic research and study of the Serb community history in Hungary and wider areas of historical Lands of the Crown of Saint Stephen.

In 2023, the archives celebrated the completion of its renovation and official reopening. Renovation was funded by the Government of Republika Srpska and the Ministry of Culture of Serbia. In 2024, the Eparchy of Buda and the Archives of Vojvodina announced an enhancement in their collaborative efforts concerning processing, restoration, and promotion of archival materials held in Szentendre, especially those in Hungarian and Latin language.

== See also ==
- List of archives in Hungary
- List of archives in Serbia
- Archives of the Serbian Orthodox Church
- Archives of Sremski Karlovci
- Archives of Serbs in Croatia
