= List of libraries in Hungary =

This is a list of libraries in Hungary.

== Libraries by region ==
=== Budapest ===
- Bibliotheca Corviniana (active 15th-16th c.)
- Budapest University Library
- Comic Book Library, Budapest (Hungarian: Képregénykönyvtár)
- Corvinus University of Budapest University Library
- Franz Liszt Academy of Music Library
- Hungarian Academy of Sciences Library and Information Centre
- Hungarian Central Statistical Office Library
- Library of the Hungarian Parliament
- Metropolitan Ervin Szabó Library
- National Széchényi Library
- Public Library (Budapest) (Hungarian: Közkincs Könyvtár)

=== Central Hungary ===
- Cegléd City Library (Hungarian: Ceglédi Városi Könyvtár)
- Zoltán Csuka Municipal Library, Érd (Hungarian: Csuka Zoltán Városi Könyvtár)

=== Central Transdanubia ===
- Cathedral Library of Esztergom
- University of Pannonia, University Library and Knowledge Center, Veszprém
- Gyula Krúdy Municipal Library, Várpalota
- Vörösmarty Mihály Library, Székesfehérvár

=== Northern Great Plain ===
- Debrecen City Library
- Ferenc Verseghy Library and Public Cultural Institution, Szolnok
- University of Debrecen University and National Library

=== Northern Hungary ===
- Miskolc City Library

=== Southern Great Plain ===
- Justh Zsigmond Municipal Library, Orosháza
- Katona József Library, Kecskemét
- Somogyi Károly City and County Library, Szeged
- University of Szeged, Klebelsberg Library and Archives

=== Southern Transdanubia ===
- Csorba Győző Public Library, Pécs
- László Bertók Municipal Library, Nagyatád
- Klimo Library, Pécs
- PTE University Library, Pécs

=== Western Transdanubia ===
See also: Libraries in Szombathely (in Hungarian)

- Dr. Pál Kovács County Library and Community Space, Győr (Hungarian: Dr. Kovács Pál Megyei Könyvtár és Közösségi Tér)
- Huszár Gál Municipal Library, Mosonmagyaróvár

== See also ==
- Hungarian literature
- List of archives in Hungary
- Mass media in Hungary
- Open access in Hungary

in Hungarian

- Hungarian book publishing in the 20th century (in Hungarian)
- Hungarian Librarians Association, est.1935 (in Hungarian)
