= Budapest City Archives =

- Budapest Főváros Levéltára
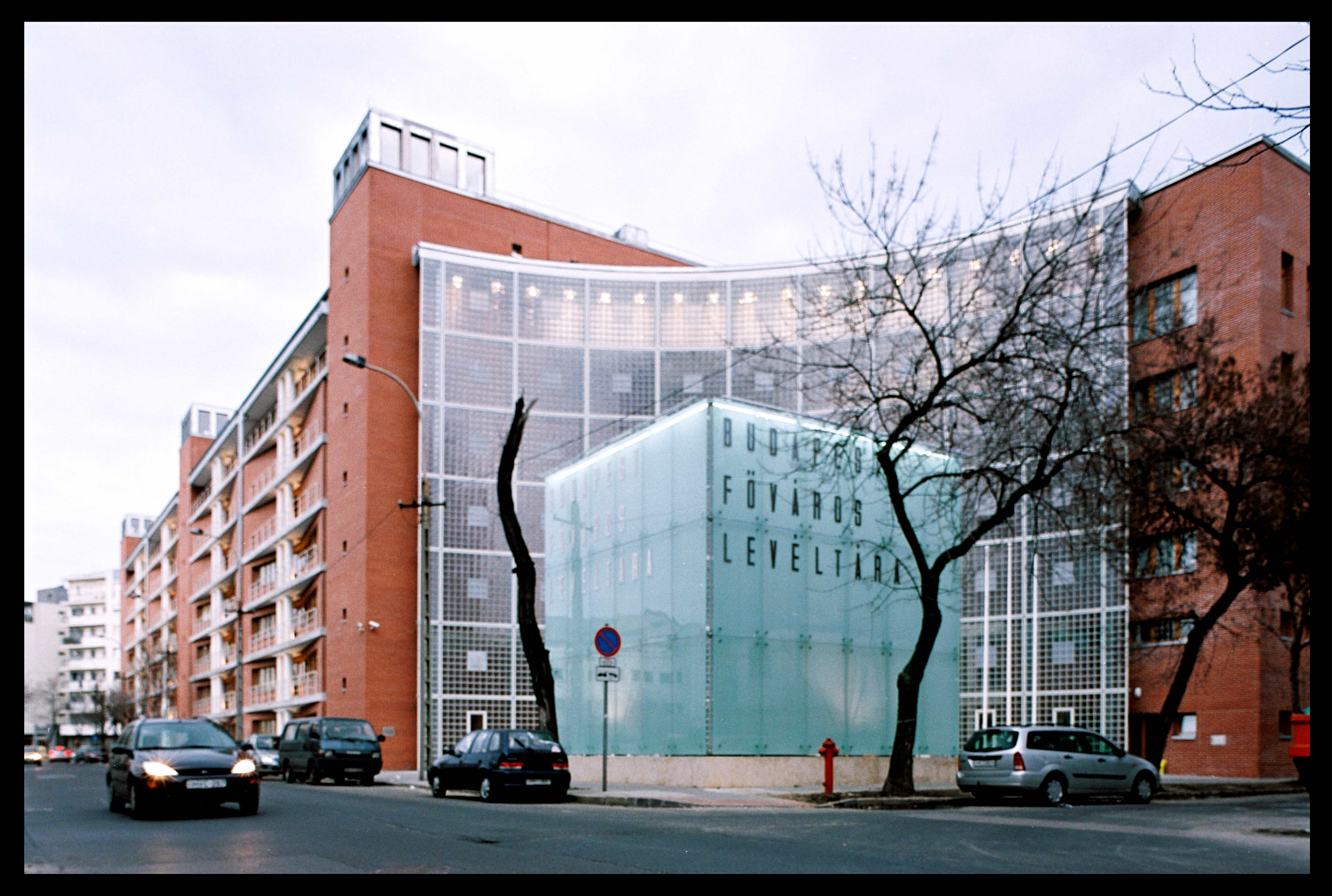
- The building of Budapest City Archives
- 47.53284241082373°N 19.07114967873622°E
- Location: Hungary
- Type: Archives
- Established: 1873

Other information
- Website: https://bparchiv.hu/

Budapest City Archives is a repository of archival documents illustrating the history of Budapest and greater Hungary. The documents and cultural treasures it keeps are of outstanding significance concerning the cultural life and identity formation of Budapest, Hungary and the entire Hungarian community.

== History ==
The history of the Archives is in close connection with the history of Budapest, the changes of the administration and the official machinery. Regarding the city life and administration in the centuries before the liberation from under Turkish rule (in 1686) we have information only from indirect sources, because the old city documents were completely destroyed during the war of liberation. From these centuries we have only a few dozen charters and other documents. The oldest document is a charter dating from 1300.

Right after the liberation from under Turkish rule Buda and Pest were governed directly by the chamber. The city councils - obeying the royal chamber - stored the documents mainly in the home of the head of the city chancellery, or one of the senior civil servants (at that time there was no city hall). Taking care of the papers was the duty of the clerks in the city chancellery.

In 1703 the two cities regained their free royal city rights, but it was characteristic of the situation that the chancelleries had no own rooms even long after this time. In the course of this century the duties of the city administration became greater and greater, the work became more and more complicated. This made professional recording and safe-keeping essential, and that is why it was necessary to create positions for city archivists. So the first city archivists were nominated in the second half of the century, the very first of them being András Pscherer, nominated in Buda in 1776. From this time onwards the archivist was one of the senior civil servants of the city gaining bigger and bigger importance. It was his duty to fulfil the archival and recording tasks and to preserve, record, and arrange the archival material together with his subordinates. Under the rule of Joseph II an attempt was made to create a new general archival system, the material was arranged at that time and it still can be found in that very system. In 1813 the municipal and juridical archives were separated. This separation met a further differentation of the archival system. In the 1850s and 1860s a new order of record management was introduced based on the principle of files in a modern sense. The archival management system which was developed after the unification of Buda, Pest and Óbuda country town, was based on the principles laid down in the former period.

The archival tasks were already performed by an independent organ, but its main duty was still a record office type work. Archival duties of scientific type came into prominence first in the 1880s. At that time the general assembly of the city made a conceptual decision that searching and making available the sources in the Archives must be placed at the centre of its activity. But this theory was adapted in practice only in 1901 and even than only partly. The Archives were liberated from under daily record office duties and the scope of duties was limited to preserve and handle only the papers older than 15 years. The circumstances improved at the turn of the century when the repositories - that were previously dispersed - were moved to the building of the Central City Hall. Nevertheless, the number of the employees in the Archives was too small up to recent years and although the chief archivist was one of the most prestigious senior civil servants in the city, the insufficient number of archivists did not allow a comprehensive scientific work in the institute.

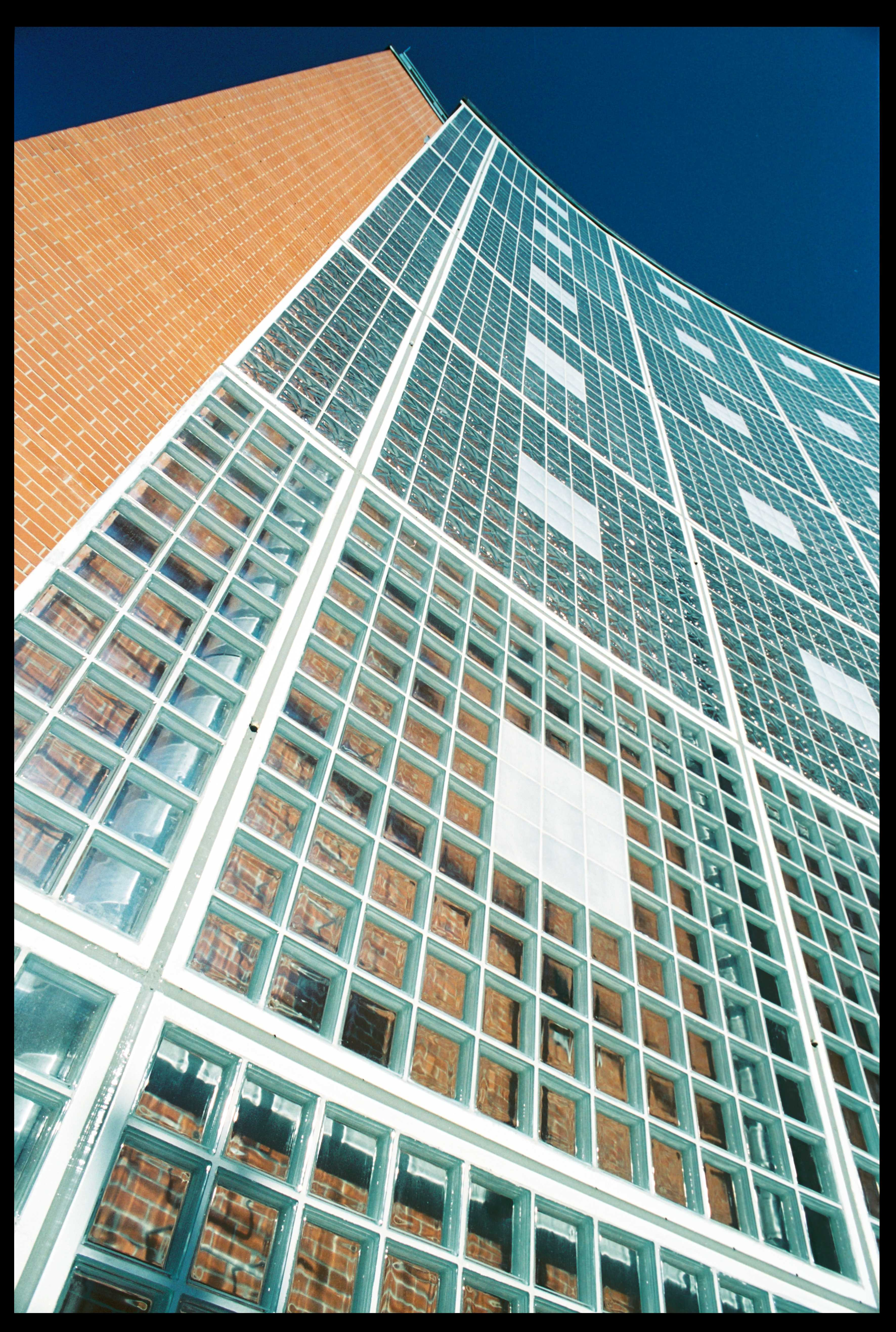
The building of Budapest City Archives

During World War II one quarter of the whole archivalia was burnt. The damage could have been even bigger, if the best part of the collection had not been brought to the crypt of the greatest cathedral in the city - the St. Steven's Cathedral - in order to put it in a safe place. Most of this material remained for decades in the damp crypt and became contaminated with mould. The last documents were brought out of the cathedral only in 1991. Because of the reforms in public administration taking place after the communist take-over, the organizational independence of the Archives came to an end, and it became supervised by a specialized agency of state administration.

The scope of collection became much larger: earlier the Archives - as the office of the city municipality - had to collect the papers of the local administration, from that time (as a regional archives) it was obliged to collect all kinds of council, state, co-operative and private material. The direct state supervision came to an end in 1968, and from then on the Archives belonged again to the city council (the municipality). The following more than two decades bought considerable progress - mainly in staff, equipment, publishing and in the growth of local historical works and public educational tasks, but to a certain extent at the expense of the professional archival work. That is why it is a great challenge now to reveal the precious historical sources in the Archives, to make the Archives more usable for the public and also to fulfil the administrative tasks rising from the new, democratic system.

The building of the Budapest City Archives is located in Teve Street, in the 13th district. The foundation stone was ceremonially laid on 11 October 2002 and the new building was opened to the public in 2004. The Budapest City Archives keeps 36000 linear meters of documents, preserves and delivers them for researchers and customers in the new building which possesses 23440 m2 of net area. The experts in 2012 honoured with Archive of the Year Prize the Archive's high quality work carried out in the field of processing and research.

== Databases ==
The database system of Budapest City Archives contain millions of records and continues to expand. They are accessible from the Budapest City Archives website, from the Digital Archives Portal and the Hungarian Archival Portal created by Budapest City Archives as well. The point of the latter is the Joint Search option and the handling of images (including pdf format, geo-referenced historic maps, etc.). The databases is made accessible mainly via the data contained in sources that contains information about the residents of Budapest, built environment, visual information and the socialist period.
