= Dolný Lopašov =

- Municipality
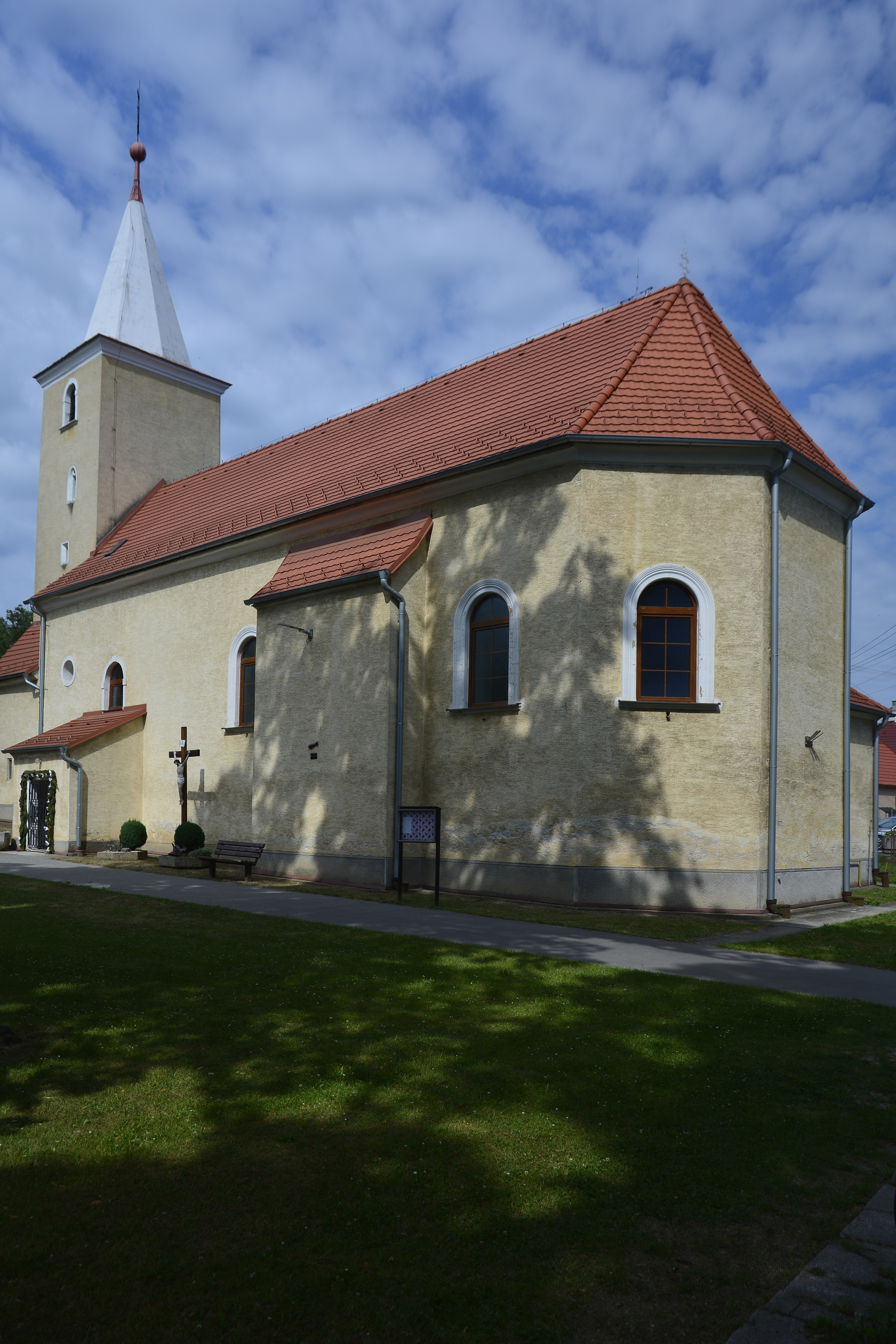
- Church in Dolný Lopašov

- Flag

- Location of Dolný Lopašov in the Trnava Region Location of Dolný Lopašov in Slovakia
- Coordinates: 48.58°N 17.64°E
- Country: Slovakia
- Region: Trnava Region
- District: Piešťany District
- First mentioned: 1394

Government
  - Mayor: Mário Beblavý

Area
  - Total: 22.93 km^{2} (8.85 sq mi)
- Elevation: 206 m (676 ft)

Population (2025)
  - Total: 955
- Time zone: UTC+1 (CET)
  - Summer (DST): UTC+2 (CEST)
- Postal code: 922 04
- Area code: +421 33
- Vehicle registration plate (until 2022): PN
- Website: www.dolnylopasov.sk

Dolný Lopašov (Hungarian: Alsólopassó) is a village and municipality in Piešťany District in the Trnava Region of western Slovakia. The current mayor of Dolný Lopašov is Mário Beblavý, who won the election held on November 10, 2018 as an independent candidate.

== History ==
In historical records the village was first mentioned in 1394.

== Geography ==
The municipality lies at an altitude of 206 metres (676 ft) and covers an area of 22.93 km^{2} (8.85 sq mi) (2025).

== Population ==
Population statistic (10 years)
Year	1995	2005	2015	2025
Count	969	968	945	955
Difference		−0.10%	−2.37%	+1.05%

Population statistic
Year	2024	2025
Count	964	955
Difference		−0.93%

It has a population of 955 people (31 December 2025).

=== Ethnicity ===
Census 2021 (1+ %)
Ethnicity	Number	Fraction
Slovak	957	96.08%
Not found out	40	4.01%
Total	996	

In year 2021 was 996 people by ethnicity 957 as Slovak, 40 as Not found out, 5 as Czech, 1 as Chinese, 1 as Rusyn and 1 as Russian.

Note on population: The difference values of population numbers in the table "Population statistic" and in the sections "Ethnicity" & "Religion" is caused by the use of various statistical methods.

=== Religion ===
Census 2021 (1+ %)
Religion	Number	Fraction
Roman Catholic Church	705	70.78%
None	205	20.58%
Not found out	37	3.71%
Evangelical Church	16	1.61%
Greek Catholic Church	10	1%
Total	996	

In year 2021 was 996 people by religion 705 from Roman Catholic Church, 205 from None, 37 from Not found out, 16 from Evangelical Church, 10 from Greek Catholic Church, 7 from Paganism and natural spirituality, 5 from Other and not ascertained christian church, 5 from Ad hoc movements, 2 from Christian Congregations in Slovakia, 2 from Other, 1 from Jehovah's Witnesses and 1 from Buddhism.

== Genealogical resources ==
The records for genealogical research are available at the state archive "Statny Archiv in Bratislava, Slovakia"

- Roman Catholic church records (births/marriages/deaths): 1698-1897 (parish A)

== See also ==
- List of municipalities and towns in Slovakia
