= Leopold von Ranke =

German historian (1795–1886)

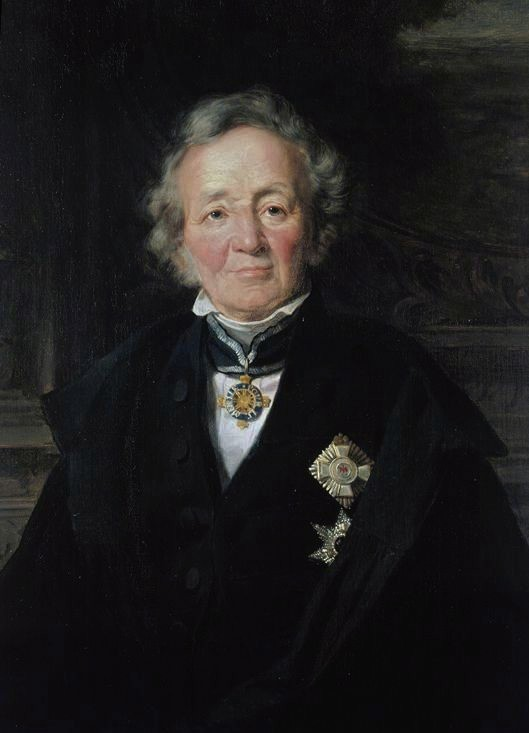
- 1875 portrait of Ranke by Adolf Jebens
- Born: Leopold Ranke; 21 December 1795; Wiehe, Electorate of Saxony, Holy Roman Empire
- Died: 23 May 1886 (aged 90); Berlin, Kingdom of Prussia, German Empire
- Occupation: Historian
- Known for: Historism
- Spouse: Clarissa von Ranke

Academic background
- Education: University of Leipzig
- Academic advisor: Gottfried Hermann

Academic work
- Institutions: University of Berlin
- Doctoral students: F. W. Schirrmacher; Heinrich von Sybel; Georg Waitz
- Notable students: Jacob Burckhardt; Wilhelm Dilthey; Albert Hauck; Philipp Jaffé; Jovan Ristić

Leopold von Ranke (Note: German: [fɔn ˈʁaŋkə]) (21 December 1795 – 23 May 1886) was a German historian and a founder of modern source-based history. He was able to implement the seminar teaching method in his classroom and focused on archival research and the analysis of historical documents. Building on the methods of the Göttingen school of history, he was the first to establish a historical seminar. Ranke set the standards for much of later historical writing, introducing such ideas as reliance on primary sources (empiricism), an emphasis on narrative history and especially international politics (Außenpolitik). He was ennobled in 1865, with the addition of a "von" to his name.

Ranke also had a great influence on Western historiography and is considered a symbol of the quality of 19th century German historical studies. Ranke, influenced by Barthold Georg Niebuhr, was very talented in constructing narratives without exceeding the limits of historical evidence. His critics have noted the influence of Lutheranism in guiding his work, especially his belief that God's actions were manifest in the lives of men and history, a viewpoint that shaped his ideas that the German Empire was a manifestation of God's intent.

== Early life ==
Ranke was born in Wiehe, in the Electorate of Saxony. Wiehe was then a part of the Electorate of Saxony. He came from a family of Lutheran pastors and lawyers. He was educated partly at home and partly in the gymnasium at Schulpforta. His early years engendered a lifelong love of Ancient Greek, Latin and Lutheranism. In 1814, Ranke entered Leipzig University, where his subjects were classics and Lutheran theology. At Leipzig, Ranke became an expert in philology and translation of the ancient authors into German. His teachers included Johann Gottfried Jakob Hermann. When he was a student, Ranke's favorite authors were Thucydides, Livy, Dionysius of Halicarnassus, Johann Wolfgang von Goethe, Barthold Georg Niebuhr, Immanuel Kant, Johann Gottlieb Fichte, Friedrich Wilhelm Joseph Schelling and Friedrich Schlegel. Ranke showed little interest in the work of modern history because of his dissatisfaction with what he regarded as history books that were merely a collection of facts lumped together by modern historians.

Between 1817 and 1825, Ranke worked as a schoolmaster teaching classics at the Friedrichs Gymnasium in Frankfurt an der Oder. During this time, he became interested in history in part because of his desire to be involved in the developing field of a more professionalized history and in part because of his desire to find the hand of God in the workings of history.

== Career ==
In 1824, Ranke launched his career with the book Geschichten der romanischen und germanischen Völker von 1494 bis 1514 (Histories of the Latin and Teutonic Peoples from 1494 to 1514) in which he used an unusually wide variety of sources for a historian of the age, including "memoirs, diaries, personal and formal missives, government documents, diplomatic dispatches and first-hand accounts of eye-witnesses". In that sense, he leaned on the traditions of philology but emphasized mundane documents instead of old and exotic literature.

After the minister of education was impressed with the work of a historian who did not have access to the nation's great public libraries, Ranke was given a position in the University of Berlin, where he was a professor for nearly fifty years, starting in 1825. At the university, he used the seminar system and taught how to check the value of sources. Ranke became deeply involved in the dispute between the followers of the legal professor Friedrich Carl von Savigny, who emphasized the varieties of different periods of history, and the followers of the philosopher Georg Wilhelm Friedrich Hegel, who saw history as the unfolding of a universal story. Ranke supported Savigny and criticized the Hegelian view of history as being a one-size-fits-all approach. Also during his time in Berlin, Ranke became the first historian to use the forty-seven volumes that comprised the diplomatic archives of Venice from the 16th and 17th centuries. Since many archives opened up during this time, he sent out his students to these places to recruit information. In his classrooms, he would discuss the sources that his students would find and would emphasize that history should be told "as it really happened" (wie es eigentlich gewesen). Therefore, he is often seen as "the pioneer of a critical historical science". Meanwhile, Ranke came to prefer dealing with primary sources as opposed to secondary sources.

It was in Vienna where the friendship of Friedrich von Gentz and the protection of Klemens von Metternich opened to him the Venetian Archives, a fresh source, the value of which he first discovered; it is still not exhausted. He found time to write a short book entitled Die Serbische Revolution (1829) from material supplied to him by Vuk Karadžić, a Serb who had himself been witness to the scenes he related during the First Serbian Uprising in 1804. This was afterwards expanded into Serbien und die Turkei im 19 Jahrhundert (1879).

At the behest of the Prussian government, Ranke founded and edited the Historische-Politische Zeitschrift journal from 1832 to 1836. Ranke, who was a conservative, used the journal to attack the ideas of liberalism. In his 1833 article "The Great Powers" and his 1836 article "Dialogue on Politics", Ranke claimed that every state is given a special moral character from God and individuals should strive best to fulfill the "idea" of their state. Thus, in this way, Ranke urged his readers to stay loyal to the Prussian state and to reject the ideas of the French Revolution, which Ranke claimed were meant for France only.

From 1834 to 1836, Ranke published Die römischen Päpste, ihre Kirche und ihr Staat im sechzehnten und siebzehnten Jahrhundert (The Popes of Rome, Their Church and State in the Sixteenth and Seventeenth Centuries) (3 vols.). As a Protestant, Ranke was barred from viewing the Vatican Secret Archive in Rome, but based on private papers in Rome and Venice, he was able to explain the history of the papacy in the 16th century. In this book, Ranke coined the term "Counter-Reformation" and offered colorful portrayals of Pope Paul IV, Ignatius of Loyola and Pope Pius V. He promoted research into primary sources: "I see the time approaching when we shall base modern history, no longer on the reports even of contemporary historians, except insofar as they had personal and immediate knowledge of facts; and still less on work yet more remote from the source; but rather on the narratives of eyewitnesses, and on genuine and original documents".

The papacy denounced Ranke's book as anti-Catholic. In contrast, many Protestants denounced it as not anti-Catholic enough. Still, historians have generally praised him for placing the situation of the Catholic Church in the context of the 16th century and for his fair treatment of the complex interaction of the political and religious issues in that century. The British Catholic historian Lord Acton defended Ranke's book as the most fair-minded, balanced and objective study ever written on the papacy of the 16th century.

In 1841, his fame in its ascendancy, Ranke was appointed Historiographer Royal to the Prussian court. In 1845, he became a member of the Royal Netherlands Academy of Arts and Sciences.

In Paris, Ranke met the Irish woman Clarissa Helena Graves (born 1808) from Dublin in July 1843. She had been educated in England and the Continent. They were engaged on 1 October and married in Bowness, England in a ceremony officiated by her brother Robert Perceval Graves, an Anglican priest. They had three sons (one of whom died in infancy), and one daughter.

From 1847 to 1848, Ranke published Neun Bücher preußischer Geschichte (translated as Memoirs of the House of Brandenburg and History of Prussia, during the Seventeenth and Eighteenth Centuries) in which he examined the fortunes of the Hohenzollern family and state from the Middle Ages to the reign of Frederick the Great. Many Prussian nationalists were offended by Ranke's portrayal of Prussia as a typical medium-sized German state rather than as a great power.

From 1852 to 1861, Ranke published French History Mainly in the 16th and 17th Centuries (5 vols.), covering Francis I to Louis XIV and gaining him more praise for his impartiality despite being German.

In a series of lectures given before future King Maximilian II of Bavaria in 1854, Ranke argued that "every age is next to God", by which he meant that every period of history is unique and must be understood in its own context. He argued that God gazes over history in its totality and finds all periods equal. Ranke rejected the teleological approach to history, by which each period is considered inferior to the following period. Thus, the Middle Ages were not inferior to the Renaissance, simply different. In Ranke's view, historians had to understand a period and its terms and seek to find only the general ideas that animated every period of history. For Ranke, history was not to be an account of man's "progress" because "[a]fter Plato, there can be no more Plato". Ultimately, "[h]istory is no criminal court".

For Ranke, Christianity was morally most superior and could not be improved upon. When he wrote Zur orientalischen Frage. Gutachten at the behest of the Kaiser he framed the conflict with the Ottoman Empire as primarily religious; the civil rights of Christians against Muslims in the Ottoman Empire could only be secured by the intervention of the Christian European nations.

From 1854 to 1857, Ranke published History of the Reformation in Germany (Deutsche Geschichte im Zeitalter der Reformation), using the ninety-six volumes of correspondence from ambassadors to the Imperial Diet he found in Frankfurt to explain the Reformation in Germany as the result of both politics and religion.

From 1859 to 1867, Ranke published the six-volume History of England Principally in the Sixteenth and Seventeenth Centuries (Englische Geschichte vornehmlich im XVI und XVII Jahrhundert), followed by an expanded nine-volume edition from 1870 to 1884, which extended his huge reach even further. At this point, he was eighty years old, and devoted the rest of his career to shorter treatises on German history that supplement his earlier writings.

== Later life ==
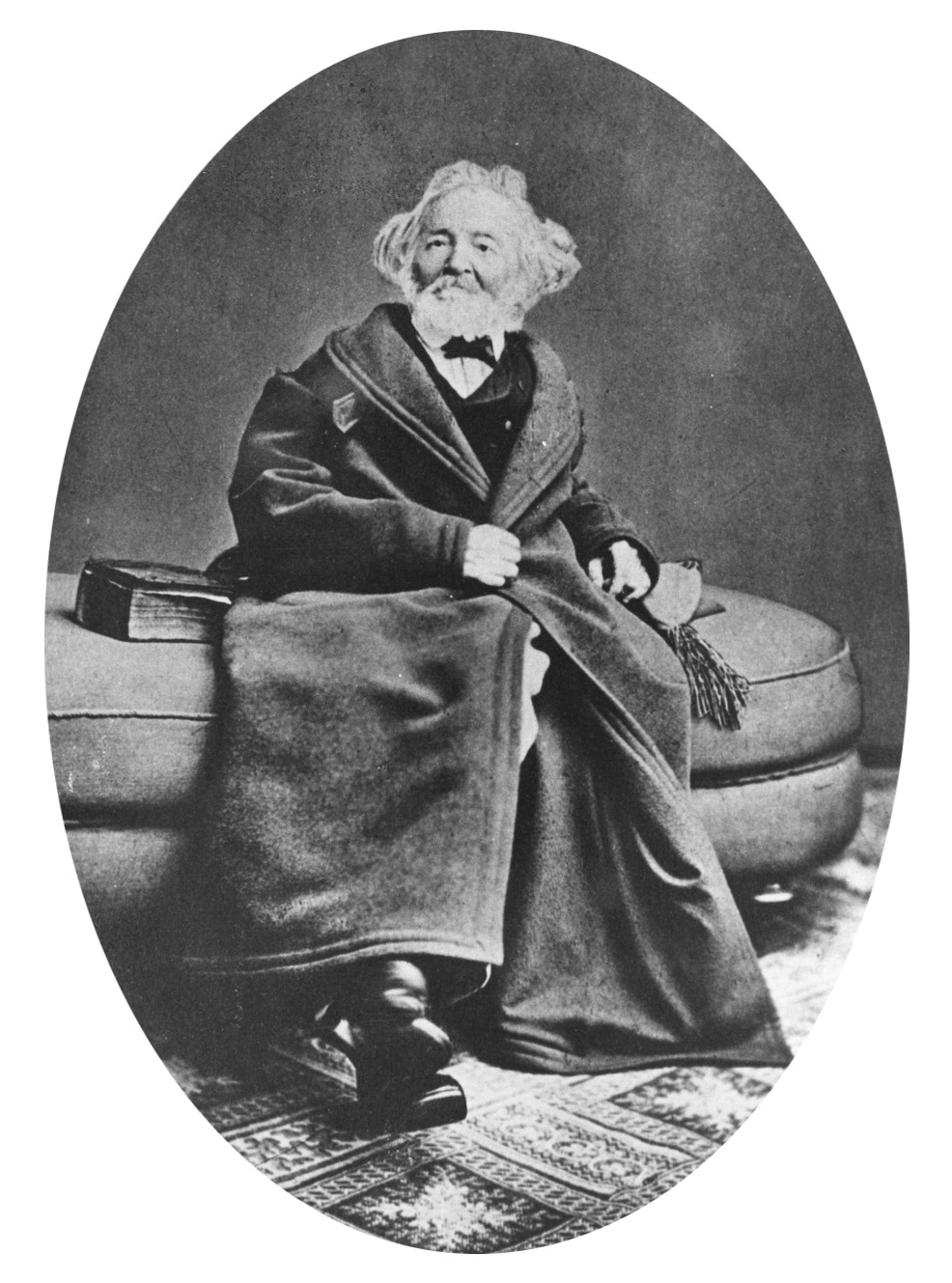
1877 portrait of Ranke

The honors poured in when Ranke was ennobled in 1865, appointed a Prussian Privy Councillor in 1882 and given an honorary citizenship of Berlin in 1885. In 1884, he was appointed the first honorary member of the American Historical Association. In 1885, he was elected as a member to the American Philosophical Society. After his retirement in 1871, Ranke continued to write on a variety of subjects relating to German history such as the French Revolutionary Wars, Albrecht von Wallenstein, Karl August von Hardenberg, and King Frederick William IV of Prussia. In 1880, Ranke began a huge six-volume work on world history which began with ancient Egypt and the Israelites. By the time of his death in Berlin in 1886 at the age of 90, Ranke had reached only the 12th century, but his assistants later used his notes to take the series up to 1453. After his wife died in 1871, Ranke became half-blind, depending on assistants to read to him. A diary entry from January 1877 contains his mature thoughts about being a historian:

The proverb tells us that poets are born. Not only in the arts, but even in some scholarly fields, young men develop into full bloom, or at least display their originality. Musicians and mathematicians have the expectation of attaining eminence in early years. But a historian must be old, not only because of the immeasurable extent of his field of study, but because of the insight into the historical process which a long life confers, especially under changing conditions. It would hardly be bearable for him to have only a short span of experience. For his personal development requires that great events complete their course before his eyes, that others collapse, that new forms be attempted.

After Ranke's death, Syracuse University purchased his collection. The Ranke Library of 25,000 books and other materials was ten times as large as the university's own.

== Methodology and criticism ==
At the core of his method, Ranke did not believe that general theories could cut across time and space. Instead, he made statements about the time using quotations from primary sources, saying: "My understanding of 'leading ideas' is simply that they are the dominant tendencies in each century. However, these tendencies can be only described; they cannot, in the last resort, be summed up in a concept". Ranke objected to philosophy of history, particularly as practiced by Hegel, claiming that Hegel ignored the role of human agency in history which was too essential to be "characterized through only one idea or one word" or "circumscribed by a concept". This lack of emphasis on unifying theories or themes led Rudolf Haym to denigrate his ideas as "the mindlessness of the empiricist". In the 19th century, Ranke's work was very popular and his ideas about historical practice gradually became dominant in western historiography. However, he had critics among his contemporaries, including Karl Marx, a former Hegelian, who suggested that Ranke engaged in some of the practices he criticized in other historians.

Ranke began his first book with the statement in the introduction that he would show the unity of the experiences of the "Teutonic" nations of Scandinavia, England and Germany and the "Latin" nations of Italy, Spain and France through the great "respirations" of the Völkerwanderung (great migration), the Crusades and colonization that in Ranke's view bound all of the nations together to produce modern European civilization. Despite his opening statement, Ranke largely treated all of the nations under examination separately until the outbreak of the wars for the control of Italy starting in 1494. However, the book is best remembered for Ranke's comment: "To history has been assigned the office of judging the past, of instructing the present for the benefit of future ages. To such high offices this work does not aspire: It wants only to show what actually happened (wie es eigentlich gewesen)". Ranke's statement that history should embrace the principle of wie es eigentlich gewesen (meaning "how things actually were") was subsequently taken by many historians as their guiding principle. There has been much debate over the precise meaning of this phrase. Some have argued that adhering to the principle of wie es eigentlich gewesen means that the historian should document facts, but not offer any interpretation of these facts. Following Georg Iggers, Peter Novick has argued that Ranke, who was more of a romantic and idealist than his American contemporaries understood, meant instead that the historian should discover the facts and find the essences behind them. Under this view, the word eigentlich should be translated as "essentially", the aim then being to "show what essentially happened". Ranke went on to write that the historian must seek the "Holy hieroglyph" that is God's hand in history, keeping an "eye for the universal" whilst taking "pleasure in the particular".

While Ranke's methods remain influential in the practice of history, his broader ideas of historiography and empiricism are now regarded by some as outdated and no longer credible. They held sway among historians until the mid-20th century, when they were challenged by E. H. Carr and Fernand Braudel. Carr opposed Ranke's ideas of empiricism as naive, boring and outmoded, saying that historians did not merely report facts; they choose which facts they use. Braudel's approach was based on the histoire problème. Remarking on the legacy of Ranke's dictum that historians should represent the past wie es eigentlich gewesen ("as it actually was"), Walter Benjamin scathingly wrote that it represented "the strongest narcotic of the [19th] century".

== Honours and awards ==
- Baden: Knight of the Order of the Zähringer Lion, 1st Class, 1856
- Kingdom of Bavaria:
  - Bavarian Maximilian Order for Science and Art, 1853
  - Grand Commander of the Merit Order of Saint Michael, 1866
- Belgium: Knight of the Order of Leopold (civil), 22 October 1841; Officer
- Grand Duchy of Hesse: Commander of the Merit Order of Philip the Magnanimous, 1st Class, 31 March 1875
- Kingdom of Greece: Grand Commander of the Order of the Redeemer
- Kingdom of Serbia: Grand Cross of the Order of Saint Sava
- Sweden-Norway: Commander Grand Cross of the Order of the Polar Star
- Württemberg:
  - Knight of the Order of the Württemberg Crown, 1st Class, 1842
  - Commander of the Friedrich Order, 1st Class, 1865
- Kingdom of Prussia:
  - Knight of the Order of the Red Eagle, 2nd Class with Oak Leaves, 1850; with Star, 13 February 1867
  - Commander's Eagle of the Royal House Order of Hohenzollern, 14 October 1851; Commander's Cross and Star (60 years), 29 March 1885
  - Pour le Mérite (civil), 22 January 1855; Chancellor, 20 September 1867
  - Knight of the Royal Order of the Crown, 1st Class (60 years), 17 February 1877

== Selected works ==
- Geschichten der romanischen und germanischen Völker von 1494 bis 1514 ("Histories of the Romanic and Germanic Peoples from 1494 to 1514", 1824)
- Serbische Revolution ("Serbian Revolution", 1829)
- Fürsten und Völker von Süd-Europa im sechzehnten und siebzehnten Jahrhundert ("Princes and Peoples of Southern Europe in the Sixteenth and Seventeenth Centuries")
- Die römischen Päpste in den letzten vier Jahrhunderten ("The Roman Popes in the Last Four Centuries", 1834–1836)
- Neun Bücher preußischer Geschichte (Memoirs of the House of Brandenburg and History of Prussia, during the Seventeenth and Eighteenth Centuries, 1847–1848)
- Französische Geschichte, vornehmlich im sechzehnten und siebzehnten Jahrhundert (Civil Wars and Monarchy in France, in the Sixteenth and Seventeenth Centuries: A History of France Principally During That Period, 1852–1861)
- Die deutschen Mächte und der Fürstenbund ("The German Powers and the Princes' League", 1871–1872)
- Ursprung und Beginn der Revolutionskriege 1791 und 1792 (Origin and Beginning of the Revolutionary Wars 1791 and 1792, 1875)
- Hardenberg und die Geschichte des preußischen Staates von 1793 bis 1813 (Hardenberg and the History of the Prussian State from 1793 to 1813, 1877)
- Weltgeschichte – Die Römische Republik und ihre Weltherrschaft (World history: The Roman Republic and Its World Rule, 2 volumes, 1886)

=== Works in English translation ===
- The Ottoman and the Spanish Empires, in the Sixteenth and Seventeenth Centuries, Whittaker & Co., 1843.
- Memoirs of the House of Brandenburg and History of Prussia During the Seventeenth and Eighteenth Centuries, Vol. 2, Vol. 3, John Murray, 1849.
- Civil Wars and Monarchy in France, in the Sixteenth and Seventeenth Centuries, Richard Bentley, 1852.
- The History of Servia and the Servian Revolution, Henry G. Bohn, 1853.
- History of England Principally in the Seventeenth Century, Volume Two, Volume Three, Volume Four, Volume Five, Volume Six, Oxford: At the Clarendon Press, 1875.
- Universal History: The Oldest Historical Group of Nations and the Greeks, Charles Scribner's Sons, 1884.
- History of the Popes: Their Church and State, Vol. 2, Vol. 3, P. F. Collier & Son, 1901. (Translated by Sarah Austin); first translation by Eliza Foster in 1847–48.
- History of the Reformation in Germany, George Routledge & Sons, 1905.
- History of the Latin and Teutonic Nations, 1494–1514, George Bell & Sons, 1909.
- The Secret of World History: Selected Writings on the Art and Science of History, Roger Wines, ed., Fordham University Press, 1981.
