= Paperboy (novel) =

2013 novel by Vince Vawter

- Author: Vince Vawter
- Language: English
- Genre: Young adult fiction
- Publisher: Delacorte Press
- Publication date: May 14, 2013
- Publication place: United States
- Media type: Print
- Pages: 224
- ISBN: 978-0-385-74244-3

Paperboy is a 2013 young adult novel by author Vince Vawter. The novel was a Newbery Medal Honor Book in 2014.

== Description ==
The author Vince Vawter was inspired to write the novel Paperboy because it is an autobiographical novel, almost a memoir, about his lifelong speech impediment. Although a struggle during his childhood, as an adult, Vawter considers his speech impediment to be a welcomed challenge and source of inner strength.

== Plot ==
The story takes place in 1959 in Memphis. "Little Man" Victor, an eleven-year-old boy who stutters, takes over his best friend Rat's paper route while Rat is visiting his grandparents. Little Man has various encounters with Rat's customers. The paper route poses challenges and introduces Little Man to life's daily obstacles. The book is written from Little Man's point of view.

He has a run-in with the neighborhood junk man, Ara T, a bully and thief who Little Man was warned to stay away from by his Mam. Ara puts the boy's life, as well as Mam's, in danger. Victor begins to wonder what it means to have a soul. He thinks about his talks with Mr. Spiro, a merchant sailor who has settled into the area; who he met on his paper route. He sees Mrs. Worthington walking hand in hand with her husband and hopes she's happy. He befriends a boy on the route who he has learned is deaf, and he is finally able to tell his mother that the food she thinks is his favorite is not. Though he has recently discovered that his dad is not his birth father, he embraces their loving relationship and strives to deepen it. Mr. Spiro, he learns, is going to leave soon on one of his merchant ships, and he gives Little Man a cut up dollar bill with 4 words on it, student, servant, seller, and seeker. The story reaches its climax when Ara T steals Little Man's possessions. Both Little Man and his Mam go to Ara T's neighborhood, resulting in a scuffle and the death of Ara T. By the end of the book, he is even able to speak several full sentences in front of his class, finally verbalizing his own name for the first time. Victor tells Mam he's learned that what he says is more important than how he says it and that his soul doesn't stutter.

== Characters ==
- Victor Vollmer/ "Little Man"- a stuttering 11-year-old boy who takes on a new responsibility, which is his friend's paper route, and is intrigued by all the new things happening in the neighborhood around him.
- Mam - a protective housekeeper who goes to great lengths to make sure "Little Man" is treated right.
- Arthur "Rat" - "Little Man's" friend whose paper route he is covering for.
- Ara T - a junkman who causes trouble for "Little Man" and Mam.
- Mrs. Worthington - a depressed woman who turns to alcohol quite frequently.
- Mr. Spiro - an intelligent traveler who has patience and helps "Little Man" understand things that he is intrigued about.
- TV Boy (Paul P.) - a boy who is deaf and watches TV all day to practice lip reading and is later befriended by Victor.
- Parents - mom who is real and a father who is not Victor's dad.
- Mr. Worthington - Mrs. Worthington's husband
- Coach - Victor's coach for baseball
- Big Sack - friends with Ara T, and cuts Victor's parents' lawn

== Critical reception ==
Rob Buyea, author of Because of Mr. Terupt and Mr. Terupt Falls Again stated Paperboy is an "unforgettable boy and his unforgettable story. I loved it." The Reading Countess said the story is "Beautifully written by a first-time author/retired newspaper man who stutters, Vince Vawter knows much about what he writes." One parent on Common Sense Media states "He learns many life lessons during his temporary job as a paperboy (set in the south, during the 60s), and we cheer for him as he stands up for someone he loves, despite extreme peril. Well written, compelling, and plenty of fresh, fascinating characters."

== Awards ==
- A Newbery Honor Award Winner
- An American Library Association Association for Library Service to ChildrenNotable Children's Book
- An International Reading Association Children's and Young Adults’ Choice
- An International Reading Association Teachers’ Choice
- A Junior Library Guild Selection
- A Bank Street College of Education Best Book of the Year
- A National Parenting Publications Award Honor Book
- A BookPage Best Children's Book
- An ABC New Voices Pick
- An American Library Association-Association for Library Service to Children Notable Children's Recording
- An American Library Association-YALSA Amazing Audiobook
- Amazon.com Best Books of the Year 2013: Ages 9–12
- Canadian book Honor Award
- CCBC Award
- UNKB Award
- Big Book Award NYC
