= Joanna Masingila =

American mathematician

Joanna Osborne Masingila (born 1960) is an American mathematics educator. She served as the dean of the School of Education at Syracuse University from 2015 to 2021, Laura J. and L. Douglas Meredith Professor for Teaching Excellence, and a professor of mathematics and mathematics education at Syracuse.

== Education and career ==
Masingila is originally from Oregon, and moved to Kansas as a child. She was a student at Hesston College, and graduated from Goshen College in 1982, with a bachelor's degree in mathematics. After earning a master's degree in mathematics education from Indiana University–Purdue University Indianapolis in 1987, she completed a Ph.D. in mathematics education at Indiana University Bloomington in 1992. Her dissertation, Mathematics Practice and Apprenticeship in Carpet Laying: Suggestions for Mathematics Education, was supervised by Frank K. Lester Jr.

While completing her graduate education, Masingila worked for six years as a secondary-school mathematics teacher. She joined the Syracuse University faculty in 1992, and was named Laura J. and L. Douglas Meredith Professor for Teaching Excellence in 2003. After becoming interim dean of education in 2014, she was named dean in 2015.

== Personal life and service ==
Masingila's husband, Adamson (1956-2021), was from Kenya and also studied at Hesston College and Goshen College. In 1998 she traveled to Kenyatta University in Kenya with her family as a Fulbright Scholar, and she has continued to maintain connections with Kenya both in her academic work and through volunteer work with her church, including exchange programs in which Syracuse students visit rural schools in Kenya and Kenyatta students travel to Syracuse for additional study. Masingila married George Nyagisere, a Kenyan, in December 2024.

Masingila served as president of the New York Association of Colleges for Teacher Education from 2016-2018 and then past present from 2018-2020. In 2020, Masingila was appointed to the New York State Professional Standards and Practices Board for Teaching.
