= David Falk =

American sports agent (born 1950)

David B. Falk
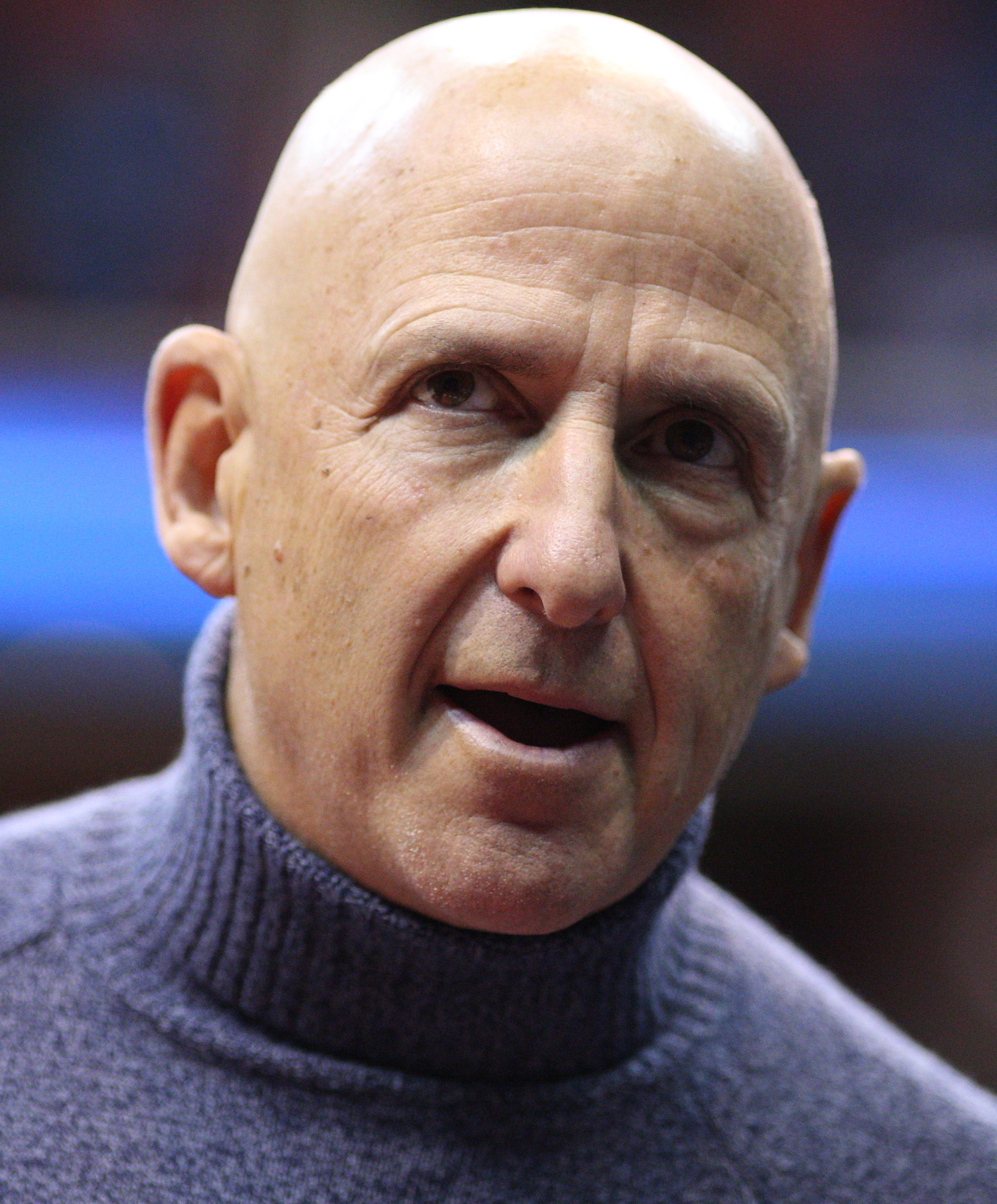
- Falk at a Philadelphia 76ers at Washington Wizards game, March 2013
- Born: 1950 (age 75–76); Long Island, New York, U.S.
- Education: Syracuse University (BA); George Washington University (JD)
- Occupation: Sports agent
- Organization: FAME

David B. Falk (born 1950) is an American sports agent who primarily works with basketball players in the National Basketball Association (NBA). He began his career representing professional tennis players for Donald Dell's ProServ and is best known for representing sports icon Michael Jordan for the entirety of Jordan's career. Besides Jordan, Falk has represented more than 100 other NBA players, and is generally considered to be the most influential NBA player agent. During the peak years of his career in the 1990s, he was often considered the second-most powerful person in the NBA behind Commissioner David Stern, and in 2000 he had at least one client on all but two NBA teams. Falk was listed among the "100 Most Powerful People in Sports" for 12 straight years from 1990 to 2001 by The Sporting News, and was also named one of the Top 50 Marketers in the United States by Advertising Age in 1995.

Falk negotiated the then-highest contracts in NBA history for Patrick Ewing and Danny Ferry. He also negotiated professional sports' first US$100 million contract for Alonzo Mourning as part of an unprecedented free agency period, during which his company, FAME, changed the entire salary structure of the NBA, negotiating more than $400 million in contracts for its free agent clients in a six-day period.

In January 2007, Falk re-launched FAME, and today serves as its founder and CEO. He represented nine players in 2012; in the prime of his sports agent career in the 1990s he represented as many as 40 players at a time.

== Personal life ==
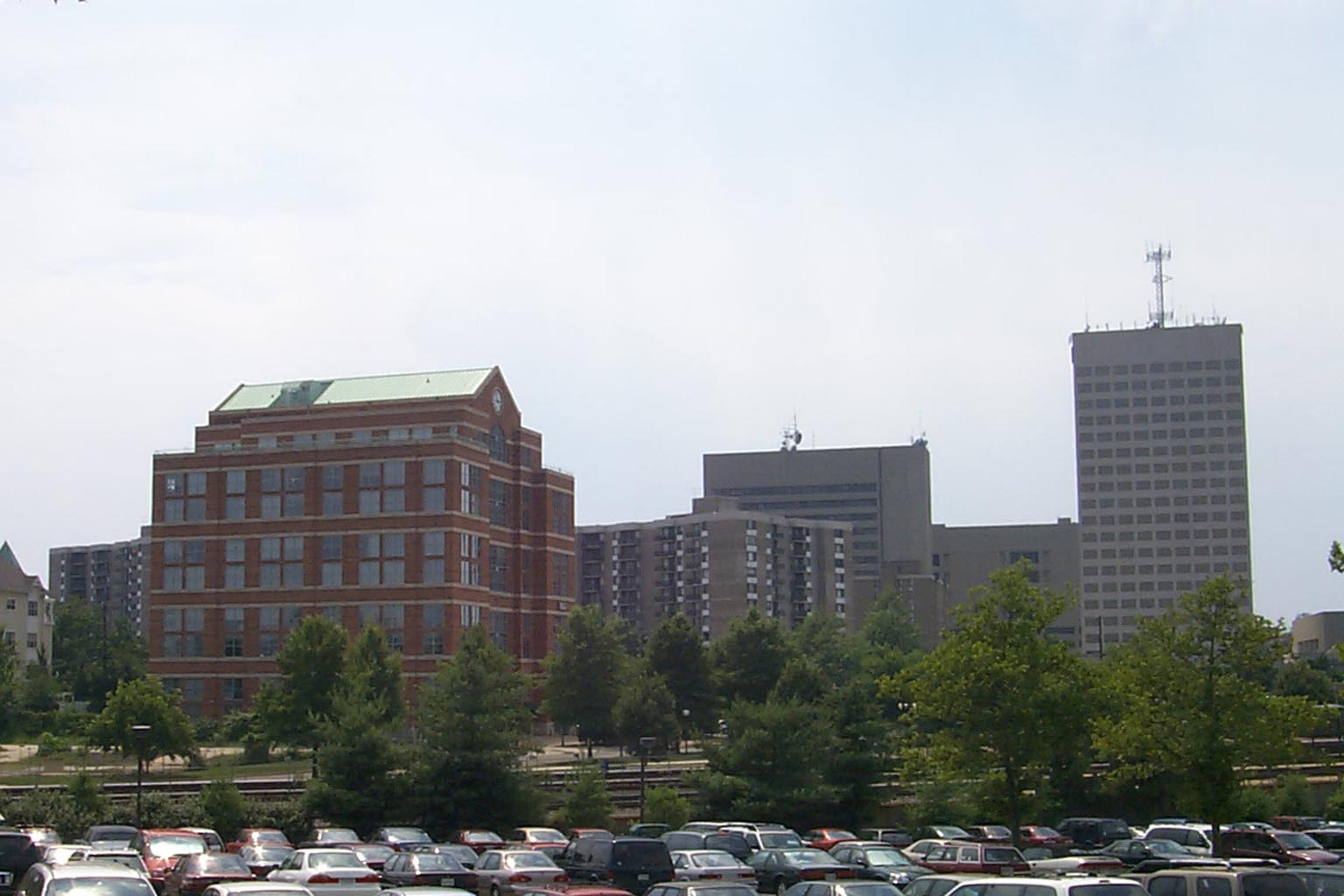
The skyline of Rockville, Maryland, where Falk lives

Falk was born to a middle-class Jewish family on Long Island, New York the second of three children. His father never finished high school and owned two butcher shops on Long Island, while his mother, Pearl, had two master's degrees, spoke six languages, and worked as an interpreter in World War II for Nelson Rockefeller in Latin American affairs.

Falk said that his mother, a teacher and inspirational force, was "a perfectionist", and called her "the biggest influence in my life", the one who drove him to achieve great heights.

Nothing was really ever good enough. I brought home my college board scores—I think I got just under 1,400 the first time. She was crushed. She didn't understand how I could do so poorly. I think that I share a lot of those qualities. She used to have an expression that I would say is the guiding principle of my life: Always shoot for the stars and never settle for second best."

Pearl Falk was an avid New York Knicks fan, a fact which influenced David's career decision upon his career path. Longtime childhood friend and colleague, Attorney Reid Kahn, remembers David proclaiming that he wanted to represent professional athletes in the fourth grade.

Another high school friend noted that David Falk was not good enough to make any of the teams at Douglas MacArthur High School in Levittown, New York, but that he was an ardent sports fan who frequently watched baseball games at Shea Stadium in Queens, New York. Falk graduated from Syracuse University in Syracuse, New York in 1972, with a degree in economics and subsequently, George Washington University Law School in Washington, D.C. where he earned a J.D. degree with honors in 1975.

While in law school, his parents separated. Falk maintained minimal contact with his father, but remained very close with his mother until her death in 1988. He lives in Rockville, Maryland with his wife, Rhonda (née Frank). Rhonda served as an undergraduate admissions counselor for George Washington University for five years. For 10 years she worked as a production manager for a software company in Rockville and later moved into the software publishing division and managed the distribution and sales of software through international resellers around the world. She serves on the board of directors of the Country Club at Woodmore. They have two daughters, Daina, (born 1983) a graduate of Duke University, and Jocelyn (born 1988) a graduate of Syracuse University. Falk was nicknamed The Bird of Prey by former Washington Post sportswriter Tony Kornheiser. Falk was portrayed by actor Chris Messina in the 2023 film Air.

== Sports marketing, promotions, and contracts ==
=== ProServ and signing of Michael Jordan ===
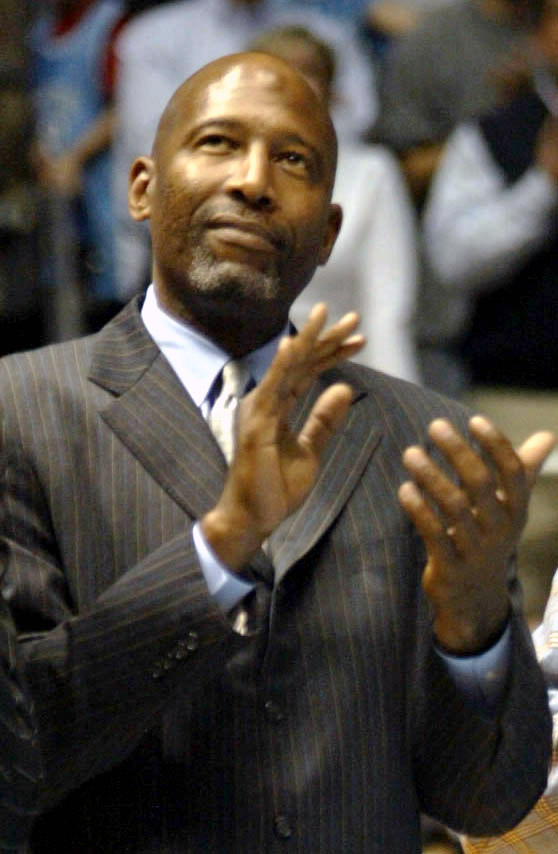
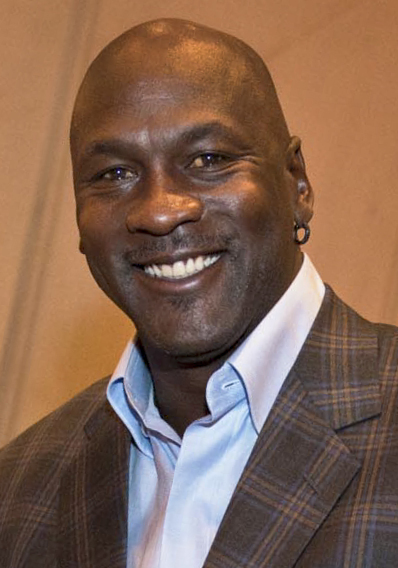
Falk negotiated million-dollar sneaker endorsement deals for both James Worthy (left) and Michael Jordan

After many attempts to establish contact with agents Bob Woolf of Boston and Larry Fleisher, Falk turned to ProServ's Donald Dell in 1974. Falk attempted to get Dell on the phone for "six or seven weeks." Finally, annoyed at Dell's seeming unavailability, Falk called Dell's office "about 17 times in a three-hour period" until Dell took his call. When Dell informed him that ProServ was not hiring, Falk offered to work for free. Dell consented to take on Falk as an unpaid intern while he was attending law school, finally offering him a full-time job starting at $13,000 after his graduation from George Washington University Law School in 1975.

Dell was a former pro tennis player and primarily represented tennis players, so he allowed Falk to handle a large portion of ProServ's NBA dealings. Falk proved to be a capable agent and negotiator, as he signed the #1 NBA draft picks in 1976 (John Lucas) and 1981 (Mark Aguirre), and negotiated the first million-dollar NBA shoe deal for James Worthy in 1982.

ProServ had an inside track with North Carolina after they successfully represented a number of N.C. basketball alumni, including Tom LaGarde, Phil Ford, Dudley Bradley, and James Worthy. In 1984, the same year that Michael Jordan entered the NBA draft, Frank Craighill and Lee Fentress, two of Dell's ProServ partners, left to start a competing firm, Advantage International. Dell and Falk signed #3 pick Jordan, while Craighill and Fentress signed Sam Perkins.

=== Nike shoe deal: "Air Jordan" ===
After signing Jordan, Falk quickly made the first great deal for him: the Nike shoe deal. At the start of the 80s, only Kareem Abdul-Jabbar had a six-figure shoe deal for $100,000 (with Adidas), and Nike was a small player next to companies like Converse, which had virtually owned the market on basketball shoes through the 1970s. After James Worthy signed an 8-year, $1.2 million endorsement deal with New Balance in 1982, also negotiated by Falk, Falk decided to make large demands to shoe companies for Jordan's services, including his own shoe line and a royalty.

We decided to stretch the envelope", Falk said. "Instead of calling up the companies and asking them how much they would pay Michael Jordan, we called them up and asked them to make a presentation and explain what they could do to promote him. Needless to say, this got a lot of quizzical replies."

Unbeknownst to Falk and Jordan, Nike had decided to target Jordan as their player of the future. Jordan himself was initially reticent; throughout college he had worn Converse because of the company's endorsement deal with Tar Heels coach Dean Smith, and off the court, he wore Adidas. Jordan had never worn or even seen a Nike shoe before the company contacted him.

Nike's initial offer was $250,000, his own shoe line, and a percentage of the revenues. Jordan already had a standing offer from Adidas for $500,000, and Falk demanded that Nike match the figure in addition to the revenue percentage. Nike came back with an offer of $500,000 and a smaller cut. Falk agreed.

"David Falk elected to take more guaranteed money and less revenue percentage", said (Nike Scout) Sonny Vaccaro. "So out of the chute he lost himself a lot of money. But in retrospect, it really amounted to nothing. It wasn't a big-time bidding war. Probably the most determining thing was Adidas wasn't going to offer him a lot of money. It was the first time that the athlete was going to share in the royalties of the shoe. That was the gamble."

The deal was all the more significant because it was considered difficult to market African-American players in 1984, especially in a team sport like basketball. In fact, Nike insisted on several "outs" in its initial contract with Jordan: the shoe line could be dropped if certain sales figures were not met, or if Jordan failed to make the NBA All-Star Game in his first three years. The shoe line was expected to earn $3 million for Nike in about three to four years. As it turned out, the Air Jordan sneaker earned Nike $130 million in 1985 alone, making their $500,000 contract with Jordan one of the great bargains of all time, a precursor to Jordan's more lucrative deals with Nike, including a 1997 deal for $30 million. Jordan's relationship with Nike is often considered the most successful sports endorsement relationship in history.

=== Marketing Michael Jordan ===
Falk allowed Nike to establish Jordan's primary image, then began splitting it up among other advertisers, including Coca-Cola, Chevrolet, Gatorade, McDonald's, Ball Park Franks, Wilson Sporting Goods, Rayovac, Wheaties, Hanes, and MCI. Falk's ideas stretched to all areas of the marketplace, including a fragrance (called simply "Michael Jordan") made by the Beverly Hills designer Bijan, which was cited as the best-marketed product of 1996 by the American Marketing Association. Falk even came up with the idea of teaming Bugs Bunny and Jordan together in a feature film, and then sold the concept to Warner Bros. in 1993. The ensuing film, Space Jam, was executive produced by Falk and released in 1996. Perhaps most importantly, Falk "set a precedent by 'opting out' Jordan from the league's licensing program, in effect reclaiming Jordan's image for his own use."

A lot of people don't like David, but he's the best at what he does", Jordan told USA Today last year. "What he does is get underneath your skin, whoever he's negotiating with, because he figures out what your objectives are, your angles. He understands the market; he understands the players. He's a brash, arrogant, egotistical, aggressive negotiator, which is good, because when you have someone represent you, you want him to do that. Marketing-wise, he's great. He's the one who came up with the concept of 'Air Jordan.'"

Due partly to Falk's tenacity and partly to Michael Jordan's own professional success and personal magnetism, Jordan became "indisputably the most powerful and effective endorser of products in American history, ... (making) the business of hawking products more lucrative than playing the game." Jordan's success was such that he turned down $300 million worth of endorsement deals in the space of four months in 1998.

=== ProServ split, establishment and sale of FAME ===
In 1992, after great early success, Falk considered himself underpaid and underappreciated. He split with ProServ and Donald Dell to establish his own company, Falk Associates Management Enterprises (FAME).

I paid more in taxes this year (1996) than I earned in 17 years working for Donald Dell", Falk said with some lingering bitterness. "I'm all for loyalty, but that has to be a two-way street."

In the split, a messy professional divorce, Falk brought all of his considerable client list with him, but agreed to provide Dell with 50% of fees for Dell's former clients and 17.5% of Falk's income for new contracts. Dell "sought arbitration to enforce the agreement, claiming that Falk 'unilaterally' had rewritten clients' third-party contracts to reduce fees to Dell".

Falk and partners Curtis Polk and Mike Higgins soon propelled FAME to the top of the NBA player representation business. At its peak, the company consisted of about 25 people and represented 45 players. During FAME's seven year existence, it represented "an unprecedented six first-round draft picks in the NBA, negotiated over $400 million in contracts for its free-agent clients, and negotiated four of the five largest contracts in team sports history". Just prior to the company's sale in 1998, the contracts of Falk's players totaled almost $800 million.

In 1998, Falk sold FAME to the entertainment group SFX for $100 million, while remaining the group's president. In the space of a year, SFX bought 14 private sports representation companies for a combined $1.5 billion and consolidated them into SFX Sports Group in 1999, naming Falk as Chairman. One of the companies SFX acquired was ProServ, and Falk found himself in charge of the company that he had left on such bitter terms.

During his Chairmanship at SFX Sports Group from 1999 to 2001, "Falk oversaw the acquisition of a dozen sports agencies that enabled SFX to represent approximately 20 percent of MLB and NBA players." Largely due to the work of Falk and fellow agent Arn Tellem, the umbrella SFX Sports Group represented 78 NBA players in contract negotiations in 2000, and came to represent approximately one-third of NBA players in 2002.

== 1995 and 1998 NBA lockouts ==
=== 1995 NBA lockout ===
Falk was one of the key figures in the 1995 NBA lockout. The lockout originally occurred when the players wanted a soft salary cap, while the owners wanted a hard salary cap. Falk led a rebellion on the National Basketball Players Association (NBPA) by establishing a dissident faction of 16 players and a number of agents (including players Michael Jordan, Patrick Ewing, Alonzo Mourning, Reggie Miller, and fellow agents Marc Fleisher and Arn Tellem) that began advocating for NBPA decertification. The goal was to strip NBA management of antitrust protection, making the salary cap and other forms of collective bargaining violations of antitrust laws, win a settlement in court, and then immediately re-form the Players' Union. NBA Commissioner David Stern criticized Falk's involvement in the negotiations, saying that he was "trashing his own clients." Kenny Gattison, the Charlotte Hornets' player representative, went so far as to blame the entire lockout on Falk.

I think this whole thing has been manufactured by David Falk", Gattison told The Charlotte Observer Friday night. "The guys he used to initiate the decertification drive aren't concerned with the union and the everyday little guy. These guys have been in the league 10 or 11 years and have yet to voice an opinion about what's going on. Then all of a sudden David Falk doesn't like what's going on."

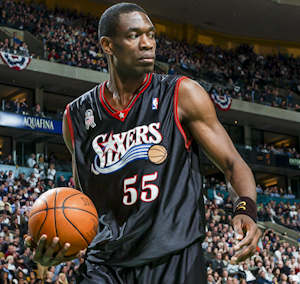
Dikembe Mutombo was one of the many Falk clients on the NBA Players' Union Negotiating Committee during the 1998 NBA lockout.

Despite considerable support, decertification was defeated by a vote of the Players' Union, 226–134. But even though Falk did not manage to decertify the NBPA, his influence helped to lead to the abandonment of a luxury tax on salaries, and ultimately led to a deal that increased the players' portion of NBA revenues from 52% to 57%, as well as the salary structure that saw Michael Jordan make $33 million for the 1998 season alone. Some argued that the concessions Falk gained from the owners through his role in the 1995 lockout were the primary cause of another lockout that occurred just three seasons later.

=== 1998–99 NBA lockout ===
During the 1998–99 lockout, Falk was often described as the "invisible hand" that guided union negotiations. The NBPA President during the lockout, Patrick Ewing, was a client of Falk's. Falk was also the agent of "nearly half" of the union's 19-member negotiating committee, including Alonzo Mourning, Juwan Howard, and Dikembe Mutombo. Though his presence in negotiations was already assumed, Falk publicly stated in an article in The New York Times, on October 31, 1998, that he would "roll up his sleeves and exert as much influence as he (could) behind the scenes,... (planning) to take a more proactive role in ending the lockout."

Shortly after his statements in The New York Times article, Falk and Arn Tellem, who together represented more than 70 of the NBA's 400 players, organized a charity exhibition game, with part of the proceeds going to financially pinched NBA players. The rosters had a number of Falk clients, and some saw the game as a threat by Falk "to create a new league through a partnership with the entertainment giant SFX, which [had] recently purchased Falk's company for $150 million." The game was played on December 19, 1998 in the Atlantic City Convention Center, featuring 16 All-Stars and drawing a crowd of about 6,000 people. Falk and the other organizers had originally planned to give 90% of the proceeds to NBA players, but public criticism caused them to instead give almost all of the $1 million to national and local charities.

Meanwhile, Falk was being criticized on multiple fronts for his role in lockout negotiations. NBA Commissioner David Stern accused Falk and Tellem specifically of "holding the deal hostage" to reap benefits for their high-end clients. Fellow player agent Harold MacDonald disparaged what he saw as Falk's excessive influence on the union's president, Patrick Ewing:

Every time I see Patrick say something, it's almost like watching the Energizer bunny", said the agent Harold MacDonald, who represents Derrick Coleman and Terry Mills. "I'm just waiting for Falk to put in another battery, and off Patrick goes again. Hardly any influence? Give me a break."

Isiah Thomas, who was President of the Players' Union from 1988 to 1994, blasted Falk by saying that "he's been trying to take over the union for years," and many saw Falk as the controlling influence in the union's negotiations. Falk's involvement in the 1998 lockout also led to Mike Lupica famously dubbing Falk "Rasputin off the bench" in a New York Daily News article, "the rare person who could make a writer root for a sports owner." The lockout finally ended just 29 hours before the cancellation of the entire NBA season after the players overwhelmingly ratified the latest deal put forward, 179-5.

== Influence and inspiration ==
=== Facilitating NBA trades ===
Falk's client list, with Michael Jordan its centerpiece, made him one of the primary movers and shakers in the NBA, able to leverage teams into agreeing to his terms on contracts and trades. Some speculated that Falk engineered as many as one of every five NBA trades during the height of his power, and he was often considered the second-most powerful man in basketball behind NBA Commissioner David Stern. In The Sporting News' list of the "100 Most Powerful People in Sports", Falk was listed no lower than #32 for 10 straight years from 1991 to 2000, peaking at #14 from 1998 to 1999.

Falk has massive leverage", says the general manager of one N.B.A. team who didn't want his name used for fear of angering Falk. "If he just had Michael, he would be considered a marketing genius, which he is. But David represents so many players that he is a major force. He pretty much gets what he asks for."

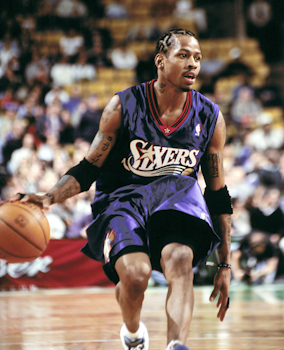
Former Falk client Allen Iverson; Falk's long list of star clients made him one of the most powerful people in the NBA

A 1999 deal in which Falk forced the Minnesota Timberwolves to trade Stephon Marbury gives a good indication of how Falk used his power. Falk threatened the Timberwolves by telling them that Marbury would walk away in free agency at the end of the season if he was not traded, as well as suggesting that he would dump his stable of free agents into the lap of Chicago Bulls GM Jerry Krause if Marbury was not moved. As the Minnesota Timberwolves started looking around for possible trade scenarios, Falk even went so far as to veto a trade that would have brought Kerry Kittles (another Falk client) to Minnesota for Marbury, claiming that Kittles had no interest in playing for Minnesota. The Timberwolves were eventually forced to send Marbury to New Jersey in a three-team trade. Minnesota's General Manager, Kevin McHale, was greatly embittered about the trade, and has been quoted as saying that "If a nuclear bomb dropped on earth, two things would survive: roaches and David Falk."

A second trade which resulted from Falk's influence was the 2000 mega-deal which moved Knicks All-Star center Patrick Ewing to the Seattle SuperSonics in a four-team trade involving 12 players and 5 draft picks. Falk apparently made threats to the Knicks that he would move Glen Rice to the Miami Heat if they did not consent to trade Ewing, who supposedly wanted out of New York.

Falk was frequently blasted for making use of threats and side-deals to move his clients around and maximize their earnings, but he remained unapologetic, arguing that he was simply looking after the best interests of his clients.

That's called leverage", he said. "Every company in the world uses leverage whenever they engage in any negotiation. It's bad for the teams and good for the players. I work for the players."

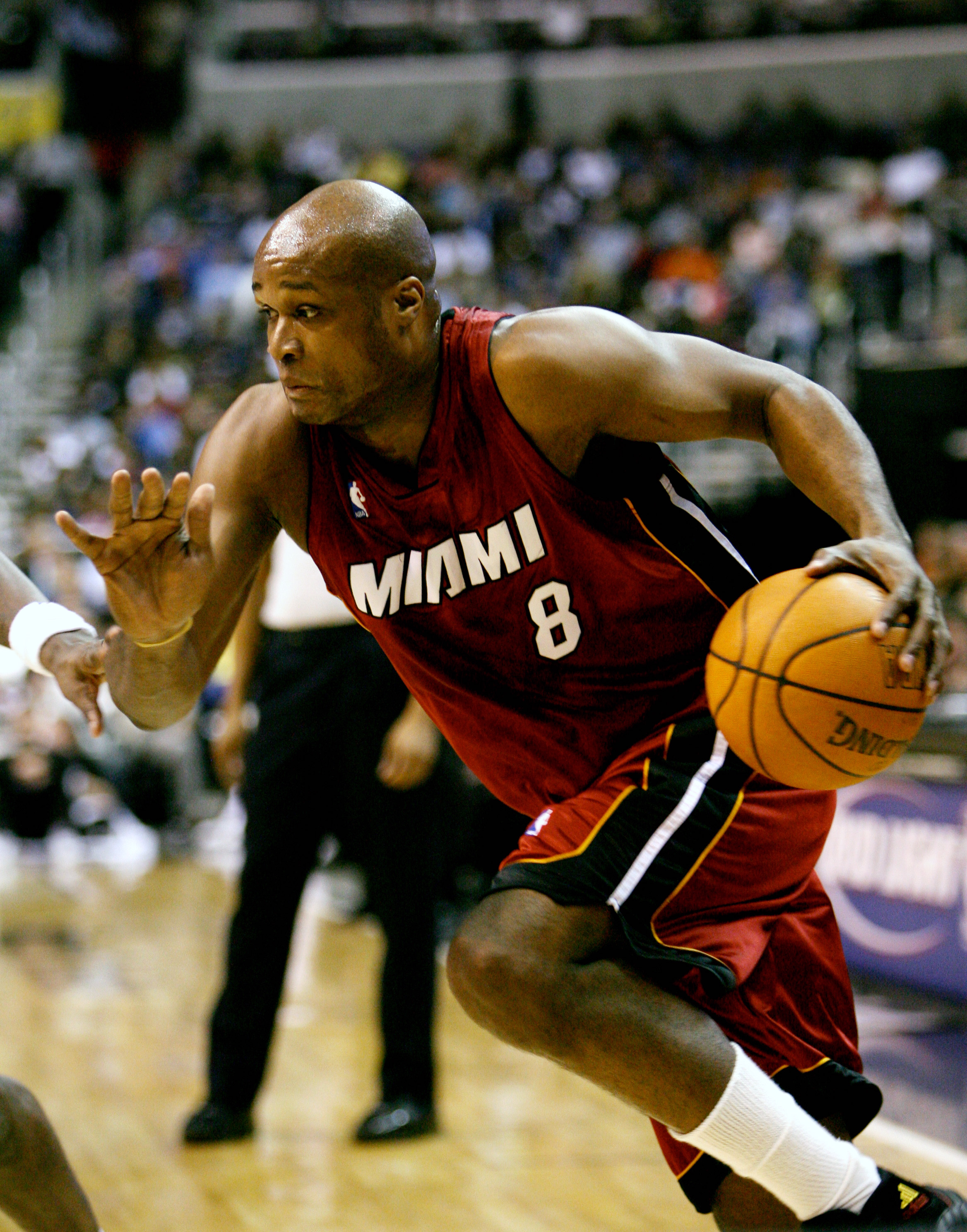
Falk negotiated a $71 million contract for Antoine Walker in 1999.

=== Building wealth for clients and himself ===
As early as 1992, even before his departure from ProServ, other NBA agents had begun acknowledging that Falk generally negotiated the contracts that defined the market for the year, and set the standard by which other agents were judged. By the end of the 1995 NBA lockout, Falk controlled enough top players that he was seen as "dictat(ing) the structure and the economics of the entire league," so much so that during one six-day period in the summer of 1996, he negotiated six contracts—for Jordan, Alonzo Mourning, Juwan Howard, Kenny Anderson, Dikembe Mutombo and Lee Mayberry—worth more than $335 million. Since Falk usually earned 4% of player contracts, which is the maximum amount allowed by the Players' Union, he made roughly $13 million for these six deals alone. He was so successful at negotiating contracts that in 1998, just before he sold FAME to SFX Entertainment, the contracts of Falk's players totaled just under $800 million.

Falk also earned as much as 20% of player endorsement deals and off-court income, and with Michael Jordan's endorsement deals alone soaring to over $40 million annually in the mid-90s, Falk counted his yearly income in the tens of millions. He also negotiated notable shoe endorsements for James Worthy, Boomer Esiason (the first NFL player to endorse the Reebok Pump) and Allen Iverson. Falk was not well-liked around the league, with even NBA executives acknowledging that they felt he held a disproportionate amount of power. As the negotiator behind four of the five largest contracts in team sports history and the pre-eminent agent in the NBA, Falk was a contributor to the spike in player salaries that saw the average NBA contract rise from $330,000 in 1984, the year Jordan was signed, to $4.5 million in 2001, when he stepped down as Chairman of SFX Sports Group. Falk himself scoffed at the venom that was frequently directed his way:

There's always something to criticize -- I have too much power or too many clients. I scoff at that. Think about it: If you lived on a block with $300,000 houses and you sold yours for $2.5 million, your neighbors would thank you. But in my business they don't. That used to make me angry. Now I'm just amused.

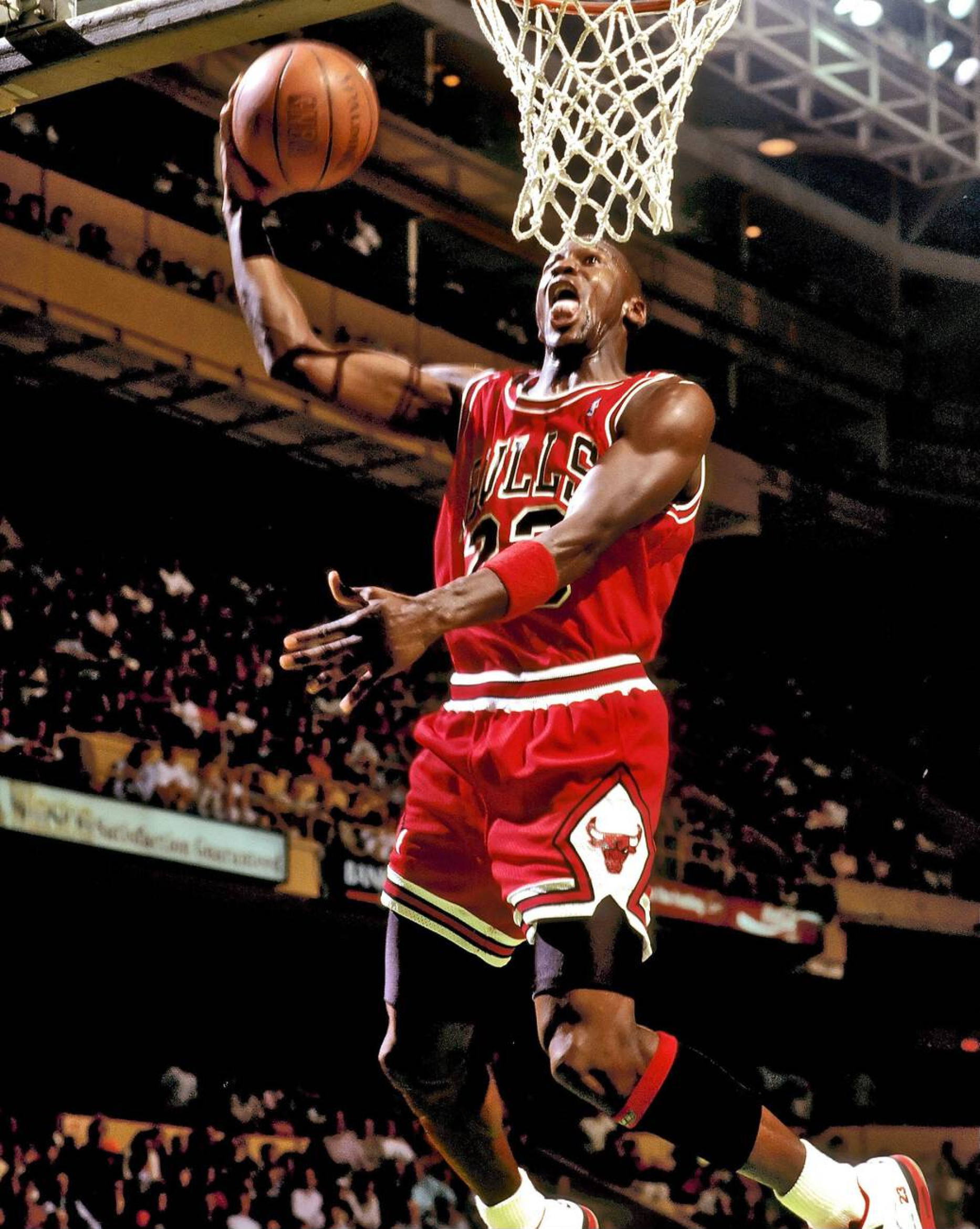
Michael Jordan is shown about to make a slam dunk. Falk helped to make the NBA a star-centered league.

=== Professional legacy ===
Falk’s enduring legacy is often associated with the NBA’s increasing emphasis on star-driven marketing and player-centered economics. He advocated the view that, because many fans purchased Chicago Bulls tickets primarily to see Michael Jordan, Jordan should receive a commensurate share of the financial benefits generated by his popularity.

Basketball is a hybrid between an individual and team sport", Falk is saying. "Very gifted players almost make a team by themselves. In that environment, a Michael Jordan, Alonzo Mourning, Juwan Howard, Shaquille O'Neal and Patrick Ewing bring in the fans. Fans come to watch them play primarily. They create marketing opportunities, new stadiums, luxury boxes, and they should be paid a disproportionate amount of money. The salary structure should be close to what it is in Hollywood, where Jim Carrey makes $16 million a film and the second star makes $2 million. That's what I believe as an economics major and as a neo-capitalist."

As David Halberstam put it in his book Playing for Keeps: Michael Jordan and the World He Made,

Michael Jordan and David Falk helped make each other, and each profited to a remarkable degree from their special collaboration. It is true that Michael Jordan was the person who in the end actually did the deeds, went on the court and hit the final jump shot again and again, but it is also true that David Falk helped revolutionize the process of representing a basketball player, going into a team sport and creating the idea of the individual player as a commercial superstar.

=== Personal legacy and philanthropy ===
On April 23, 2008, Syracuse University established The David B. Falk Center for Sport Management, an annex to the Carrier Dome, to better prepare graduates to enter the sports industry, and student-athletes to manage realities of professional sports through life-skills training, in its College of Human Ecology. It was supported by a $5 million gift from Falk and his wife Rhonda. The Falk Center's inaugural event was a panel discussion on issues in contemporary sports at Madison Square Garden in New York City. Falk is chair of the university's Sport Management Advisory Board.

On June 22, 2009, it was announced that Rick Burton was named the David B. Falk Distinguished Professor of Sport Management and will begin his position on August 20, teaching courses in international sport, sport communications and sport marketing while pursuing scholarly work, research and other academic initiatives in the Department of Sport Management. Burton was the first executive director of the Warsaw Sports Marketing Center at the University of Oregon's Lundquist College of Business, chief marketing officer for the U.S. Olympic Committee and commissioner of the National Basketball League in Sydney, Australia.

On March 24, 2011 it was announced that Falk had made a pledge of an additional $15 million to Syracuse University and "The David B. Falk Center for Sports Management" to establish the David B. Falk College of Sport and Human Dynamics. In 2014, Falk and Patrick Ewing announced a $3.3 million donation to the John R. Thompson Jr. Intercollegiate Athletics Center under construction at Georgetown University. The amount is a reference to Ewing's number, 33.

On Oct. 23, 2015, the Dean of the David B. Falk College of Sport and Human Dynamics, Diane Lyden Murphy, led a dedication ceremony to commemorate the opening of the new home of the college. For the first time in the college's history—which dates back to 1917 when the School of Home Economics began as a course in the College of Agriculture and the first nutrition course was taught—Falk College's academic disciplines and administrative offices are housed in a central location.

== Other ventures ==
Falk is on the board of directors of Sapphire Brands; a founding investor in private aviation company, Marquis Jet and Golf GCX Partners; and a founder and principal in Relevad Media Group, a digital alternative advertising company. He is a frequent guest lecturer at universities across the country including Harvard, Yale, and Duke, and serves on the George Washington University National Law Center's advisory board.

My mother was a teacher, and I think that's one reason that, amidst my deal-making skills, I have a very strong pedagogical bent", he says. "I really enjoy teaching, and believe it is one of the most important professions in our society."

=== Executive producer ===
Falk executive produced a number of sports-related films, including Space Jam, which teamed Jordan with a number of Looney Tunes characters, Michael Jordan to the Max, the critically acclaimed large-format feature, and the Sports Emmy Award-winning On Hallowed Ground, a documentary on the history of the Rucker Park Basketball League.

=== The Bald Truth ===
Falk's first book, The Bald Truth, was released on February 3, 2009.

== Partial client list ==
Falk's 2014 NBA player clients are in bold, while his non-NBA player clients are in italics.

- Mark Aguirre
- Kenny Anderson
- Vin Baker
- Charles Barkley
- Travis Best
- Mike Bibby
- Muggsy Bogues
- Keith Booth
- Dudley Bradley
- Shawn Bradley
- **Elton Brand**
- Sam Cassell
- Rex Chapman
- Calbert Cheaney
- Antonio Daniels
- Adrian Dantley
- Brad Daugherty
- Johnny Dawkins
- Michael Doleac
- Chris Doleman
- **Toney Douglas**
- Obinna Ekezie
- Dale Ellis
- Pervis Ellison
- Patrick Ewing
- Patrick Ewing Jr.
- Boomer Esiason
- Danny Ferry
- Sleepy Floyd
- Phil Ford
- Adonal Foyle
- Chris Gatling
- Willie Gault
- Matt Geiger
- Armon Gilliam
- **Jeff Green**
- Othella Harrington
- **Roy Hibbert**
- Desmond Howard
- Juwan Howard
- Bobby Hurley
- Allen Iverson
- Jaren Jackson
- Michael Jackson
- Michael Jordan
- Artūras Karnišovas
- Jerome Kersey
- Stacey King
- Kerry Kittles
- Mike Krzyzewski
- Mitch Kupchak
- Raef LaFrentz
- Tom LaGarde
- Reggie Lewis
- James Lofton
- Maurice Lucas
- John Lucas II
- John Lucas III
- Corey Maggette
- Jeff Malone
- Moses Malone
- Stephon Marbury
- Lee Mayberry
- Gene Mayer
- Walter McCarty
- Rodney McCray
- Roshown McLeod
- Xavier McDaniel
- Tom McMillen
- Ron Mercer
- Darius Miles
- **Greg Monroe**
- Alonzo Mourning
- Dikembe Mutombo
- Gary Neal
- Ken Norman
- Mike O'Koren
- Victor Page
- John Paxson
- **Otto Porter**
- Vitaly Potapenko
- Bryant Reeves
- Frank Reich
- Don Reid
- Glen Rice
- Quentin Richardson
- Mitch Richmond
- **Austin Rivers**
- Jalen Rose
- Dennis Scott
- Charles Smith
- Rory Sparrow
- John Stockton
- Rod Strickland
- **Jared Sullinger**
- Bob Sura
- Michael Sweetney
- Dragan Tarlać
- Maurice Taylor
- Tim Thomas
- Donnell Thompson
- John Thompson
- John Thompson III
- Mel Turpin
- **Evan Turner**
- Darnell Valentine
- Keith Van Horn
- Antoine Walker
- Wally Walker
- Kermit Washington
- Jahidi White
- Dominique Wilkins
- Buck Williams
- Jerome Williams
- Monty Williams
- Reggie Williams
- David Wingate
- Al Wood
- James Worthy
- Sharone Wright
