= Coville =

Coville is a surname. Notable people with the surname include:

- Arthur Coville (born 1997), French rugby union player
- Bruce Coville (born 1950), American author of young-adult fiction
- Christopher Coville (born 1945), British retired senior Royal Air Force commander
- Frederick Vernon Coville (1867–1937), American botanist
- Marion E. Coville (1870–1960), American educator, writer, activist, and philanthropist
- Thomas Coville (born 1968), French yacht racer
