= David B. Falk College of Sport =

Sport Management, Public Health, and Social Work school at Syracuse University

Coordinates: 43.0375°N 76.1374°W

Falk College of Sport
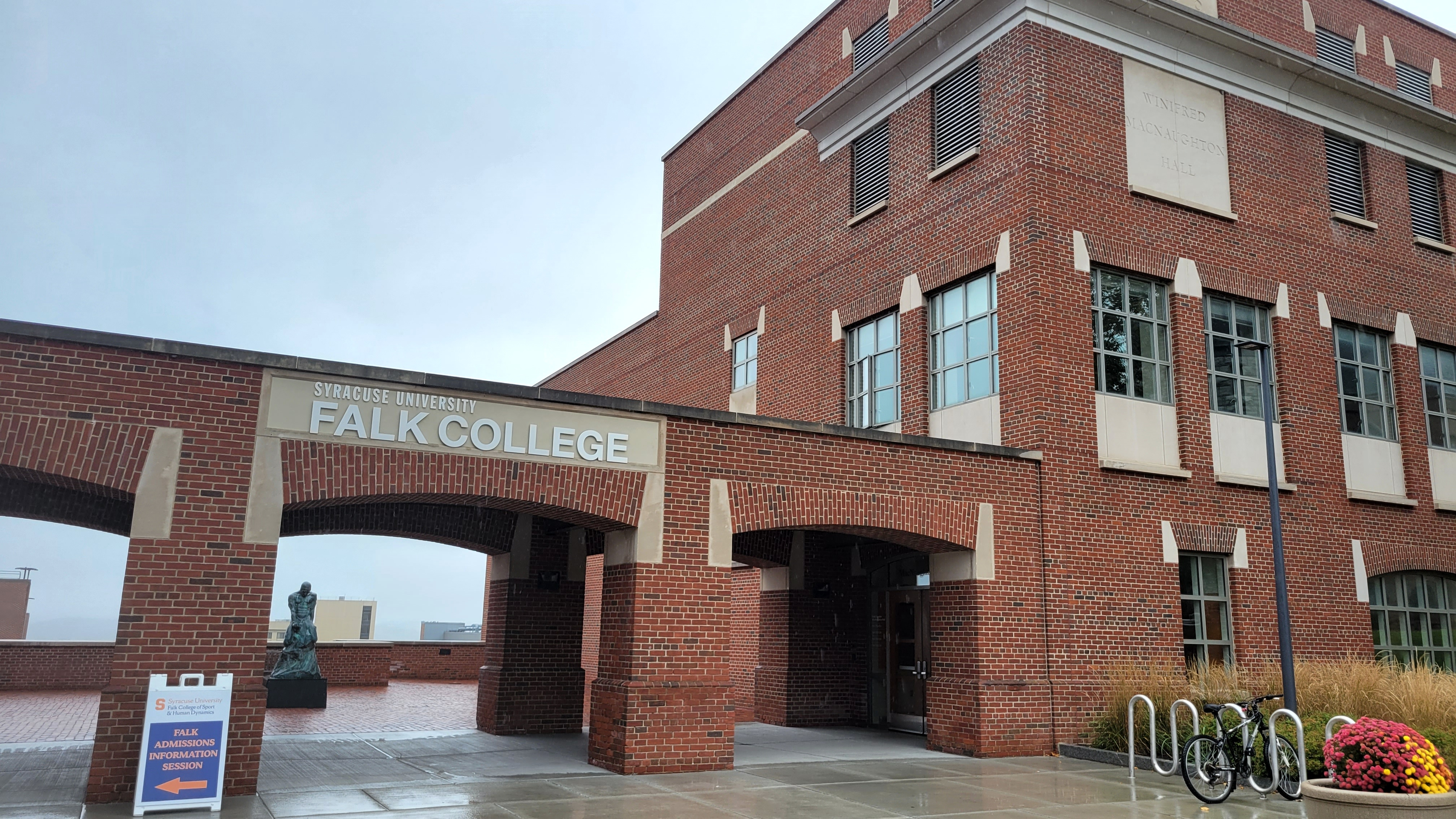
- MacNaughton Hall of the Falk College.
- Former name: College of Human Ecology
- Type: Private
- Established: 1917; 109 years ago
- Parent institution: Syracuse University
- Dean: Jeremy S. Jordan
- Location: 150 Crouse Dr,, Syracuse, New York, United States
- Campus: Urban
- Website: falk.syr.edu

The David B. Falk College of Sport, simply known as Falk College, is one of the 13 schools and colleges of Syracuse University in Syracuse, New York. Founded in 1917 as the School of Home Economics, Falk College consists primarily of the merger between the College of Human Development, the College of Nursing, and the School of Social Work. The college offers bachelor's, master's degree, and doctoral degree programs in Exercise Science, Food Studies, Human Development and Family Science, Marriage and Family Therapy, Nutrition Science and Dietetics, Public health, Sport Management, and Social Work.

== History ==
The college traces its roots to the introduction of the first course in home economics at Syracuse University in 1917, and the formal establishment of the School of Home Economics in 1918, which became the College of Home Economics in 1921 and College of Human Development in 1971.

=== College of Human Development ===
The college began in the fall of 1918 as the department of home economics in the Slocum College of Agriculture under inaugural Dean Florence E. S. Knapp. By 1919, the school was situated in the Slocum hall and also operated a student cafeteria. The then chancellor James Roscoe Day, varyingly called it the school of domestic economy or school of domestic science, but the name College of Home Economics was affirmed in June 1921. The mission of the school was to educate American women in housekeeping, business, law, civic responsibility, and public affairs to take care of the men returning from World War I.

A 1925 article in the New York Red Book called the school the leading institute of its kind in the nation, as well as the "only institution in the state chartered as a college by the state board of regents."

Dean Knapp resigned from the role in 1928, and was replaced by Annie Louise MacLeod who served as the dean for the next 20 years and significantly expanded the school's curriculum to include nutrition, fashion, and nursery education. At that point, the school offered special courses in cooking, textiles, hatmaking, sanitation, gardening, bacteriology, nutrition, nursing, home management, sewing, and household chemistry.

In 1928, the college took over the management of University Hill School, as a laboratory to study child care and behavior. This relationship came to end soon, but the school later formed its own nursery schools. The Child Development Laboratory School began in the 1950s, and was later named for Bernice M. Wright who was the dean of the college of Human Ecology in the 1970s. The college has had many female deans so far: Florence E. S. Knapp (1918), Annie Louise MacLeod (1928), Martha Eunice Hilton (1949), Bernice Huff Meredith (1964), Bernice Meredith Wright, Jane Brush Lillestol, Susan J. Crockett, and most recently Diane Lyden Murphy.

In 1942, the college welcomed its first male student, Charles E. DuBoi.

=== School of Nursing ===
The School of Nursing opened its doors at Syracuse University on 28 July 1943, in response to the growing nursing shortage due to World War II. The program absorbed the students from the nearby Syracuse Memorial Hospital and the University Hospital of the Good Shepherd, both of which closed their programs, allowing the nursing school to continue. Edith H. Smith served as the founding dean. The name of the school was changed to the College of Nursing to reflect its growing status and distinguish it from shorter certificate programs offered at other schools. By 1949, the school was ranked in top 25 nationally by the National Committee on the Improvement of Nursing.

=== School of Social Work ===
In 1955, the School of Social Work was founded to promote social justice and positive changes in society. While the university had offered undergraduate courses in social work through the department of sociology and College of Home Economics since the 1930s, it wasn't until 1952 that the American Association of Schools of Social Work noted a need for separate school at Syracuse. Howard B. Gundy served as its inaugural Dean.

The program began as a joint venture between SU and University of Buffalo, but the tie was severed after a significant grant from Rosamond Gifford Charitable Corporation allowed Syracuse to absorb the program under the University College. It was the 61st school in the country to be accredited by the Council on Social Work Education (CSWE) in 1957. Until 1971 the school only offered a master's degree program, and began admitting its first undergraduate class after the CSWE accredited social work bachelor's degree programs in 1975.

=== Merger ===
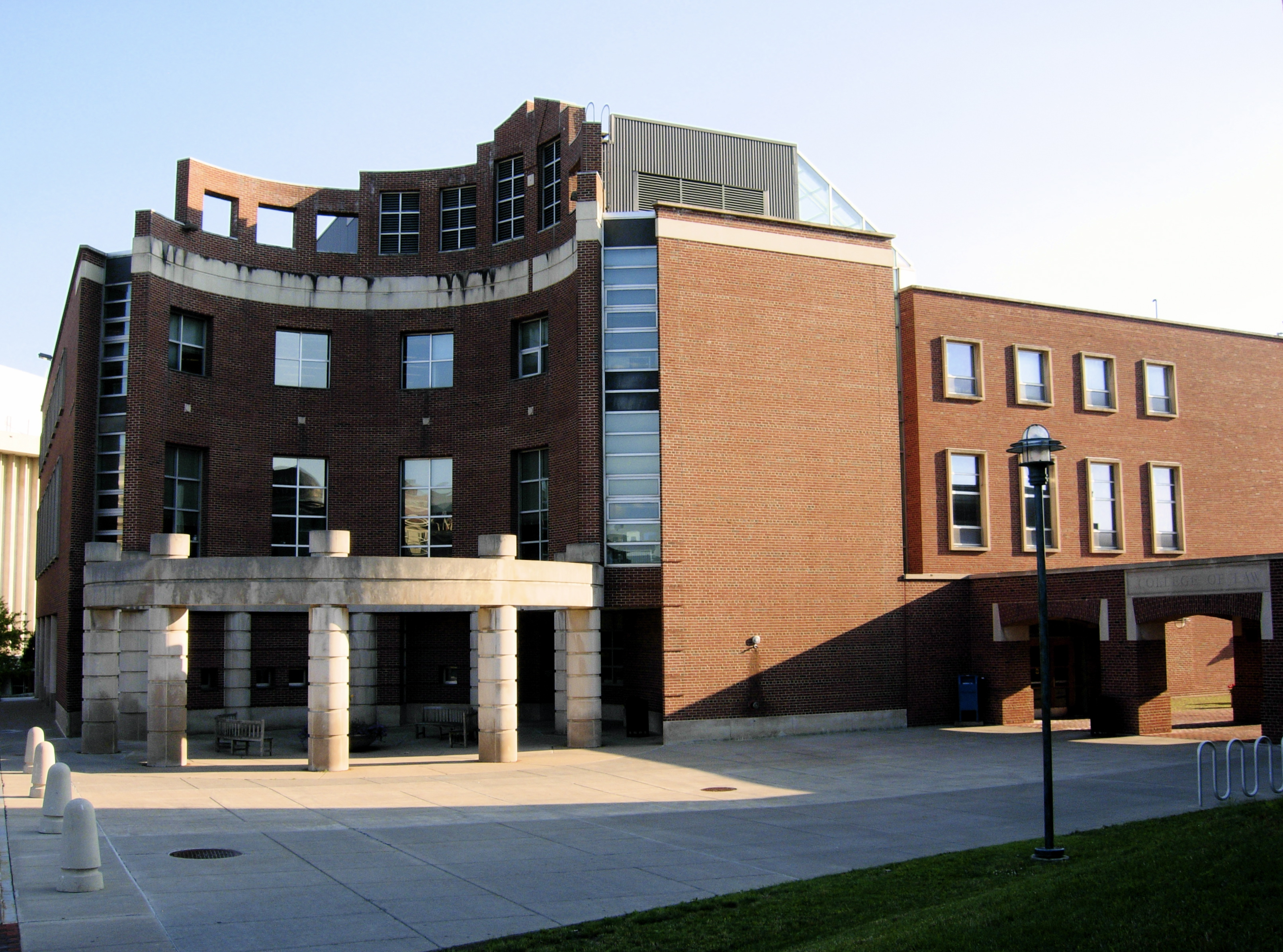
White Hall of the Falk College.

After years of declining enrollment, the College of Human Development, College of Nursing, and School of Social Work were merged to establish the School of Human Services and Health Professions (HSPS) on July 1, 2001. As part of the merger, the College of Nursing changed its name back to the School of Nursing, but the school was formally closed at the end of the 2005–06 academic year due to declining enrollment, poor student outcomes, and financial issues. Between 1999 and 2003, the School of Nursing had lost more than $9 million leading to its closure after 63 years of operation.

In 2007, the college went through another rebranding, changed its name back to College of Human Ecology. In 2011, American sports agent David Falk and his wife Rhonda Falk, both alumni of Syracuse University, pledged $15 million to the university. The College of Human Ecology became the David B. Falk College of Sport and Human Dynamics in recognition of their gift.

In 2015, The Nutrition, Assessment, Consultation and Education (ACE) Center opened for nutrition science students.

In 2020, the Department of Exercise Science moved from the school of education to Falk College.

In 2023, Jeremy S. Jordan was named the dean, succeeding Diane Lyden Murphy.

In 2024, the college announced that it will be renamed the David B. Falk College of Sport, and will to drop ‘Human Dynamics’ from its name. The move intends the college to focus exclusively on sport-related disciplines.

== Academics ==
=== Academic departments ===
The college is organized into eight major academic departments and school.

- Exercise Science
- Food Studies
- Human Development and Family Science
- Marriage and Family Therapy
- Nutrition Science and Dietetics
- Public health
- Sport Management
- School of Social Work

=== Undergraduate programs ===
The college offers a variety of bachelor's degrees, including Bachelor of Science in Public Health (BSPH), Social Work (BSSW), Health and Exercise Science, Nutrition, Nutrition Science, Food Studies, Human Development and Family Science, Inclusive Early Childhood Special Education, Sport Analytics, and Sport Management. The BSPH degree program is one of the first in New York state to be accredited by the Council on Education for Public Health.

In 2024, the school began offering a first-of-its-kind degree program on Esports Communications and Management, jointly by the S. I. Newhouse School of Public Communications.

=== Graduate programs ===
Similar to undergraduate programs, the college offers a variety of master's degrees, including Master of Public Health (MPH), Master of Social Work (MSW), Master of Science (M.S.) in Exercise Science, Food Studies, Human Development and Family Science, Nutrition Science, and Sport Venue and Event Management, as well as Master of Arts (M.A.) in Applied Human Development and Family Science and Marriage and Family Therapy. Ph.D. in Exercise Science, Human Development and Family Science, and Marriage and Family Therapy are also offered.

== Facilities ==
In 2015, the college moved into the Falk complex which is made up of the White and McNaughton Halls. Prior to this centralized location, the school had offices scattered all around the campus.

White Hall, named for Ernest I. White, was built in 1954 and housed the College of Law. The Arnold M. Grant Auditorium was added in 1966 at the southern end of White Hall. In 1998, the Winnifred MacNaughton Hall, named for Winnifred R. MacNaughton, was added to the north. It was dedicated by then-senator Joe Biden. When the law school moved to the newly constructed Dineen Hall in 2014, the space was allocated to Falk College.

The Susan R. Klenk Learning Café, established in September 2016, offers a hands-on learning laboratory and cafe for nutrition majors. The nutrition program offers interdisciplinary collaboration with State University of New York Upstate Medical University to educate for medical students.

== See also ==
List of social work schools
