= Octagon (sports agency) =

American sports and entertainment content marketing arm of Omnicom

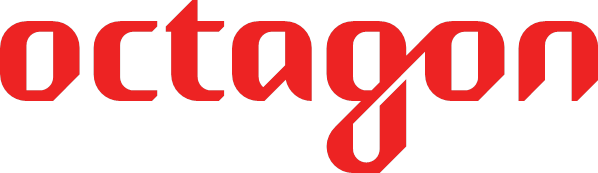
- Company type: Subsidiary of Omnicom
- Industry: Sports marketing; Entertainment
- Founded: 1982
- Founders: Phil de Picciotto; Frank Craighill; and Lee Fentress
- Headquarters: Stamford, CT (corporate marketing headquarters); Mclean, Virginia (global talent and properties headquarters)
- Number of locations: 50
- Key people: John Shea (CEO); Phil de Picciotto (President)
- Products: Advertising; Branding; Experiential Marketing; Media rights consulting; Talent management
- Number of employees: >1000 (2023)
- Website: www.octagon.com

Octagon is an American sports and entertainment marketing agency. Headquartered in Stamford, Connecticut and McLean, Virginia, it became part of American marketing and communications company Omnicom Group in 2025 after Interpublic Group of Companies was acquired by Omnicom.

== History ==
Octagon was founded on April 1, 1983, as Advantage International by attorneys Phil de Picciotto, Frank Craighill, and Lee Fentress, with its headquarters in Washington, D.C. The three had worked together at the tennis marketing agency ProServ, and decided to form their own agency.

Their early clients included tennis players Steffi Graf and Jimmy Connors, basketball players Moses Malone and Dell Curry, and Olympic athletes Bonnie Blair and Rowdy Gaines.

In 1998, the company expanded from a talent management company when it signed automaker BMW as its first corporate client.

In 1997, Advantage International was acquired by marketing agency network Interpublic Group of Companies (IPG). In 1998, IPG acquired British Sports marketing agency The AGI Group, and combined Advantage with AGI under a holding company called Octagon. In 1999, the company changed its name to Octagon, adopting the brand of its parent holding company.

Octagon entered motorsports in 1999 by acquiring Brands Hatch Leisure plc and its circuits, including Brands Hatch, Oulton Park, Snetterton, and Cadwell Park. It later acquired stakes in British Motorsport Promoters Limited and TOCA Limited, and in 2000 agreed to lease Silverstone Circuit and promote the British Grand Prix for the British Racing Drivers' Club (BRDC). Financial difficulties at parent company IPG led Octagon to sell its circuits and its interest in British Motorsport Promoters Limited in 2004, retaining only Silverstone and the British Grand Prix. The subsidiary Brands Hatch Circuit Limited was renamed Silverstone Motorsport Limited (SML). SML ceased operations later that year, with Formula One Management assuming British Grand Prix promotion and BRDC taking over its assets and liabilities. SML was later renamed Engels 1 Limited and wound down its remaining administrative matters.

In March 2012, Octagon bought UK-based creative and music agency FRUKT.

In August 2017, the company launched a media rights practice, to help clients monetize content across different viewing platforms.

In April 2021, John Shea was named CEO of Octagon's holding company, Octagon Sports & Entertainment Network (OSEN). Rick Dudley, who had been leading the agency since 2003, retired in 2022.

In April 2022, Octagon launched No2ndPlace, an agency focused on pressing social issues.

In 2025, agency network Omnicom acquired Octagon parent IPG.

== Operations ==
Octagon is a sports and entertainment content marketing company. Its business includes brand consulting, which as of 2022 oversaw more than $3.5 billion in client sports sponsorship spending across leagues, teams and media platforms, and Talent + Properties, which manages player contracts and sponsorships. The company also has a media rights consulting practice, to connect rights holders, broadcasters and distribution platforms. Octagon also includes creative and music agency FRUKT, research and consulting business Futures Sport + Entertainment, and social impact agency No2ndPlace.

Octagon's corporate clients include Anheuser-Busch InBev, BMW, Delta Air Lines, Mastercard and The Home Depot.
Its athletic talent management business represents stars such as the NBA’s Stephen Curry, Giannis Antetokounmpo, and Bam Adebayo; MLB’s Bobby Witt Jr. and Julio Rodriguez; the NHL’s Leon Draisaitl; NASCAR’s Jimmie Johnson; soccer’s Trinity Rodman; and Olympic gold medalists Simone Biles, Aly Raisman, and Michael Phelps.

The company's CEO is John Shea, and Phil de Picciotto serves as President. As of April 2023, the company reported more than 1,000 employees in 50 offices in 20 countries around the world. It operates dual headquarters in Stamford, Connecticut and Mclean, Virginia.
