= Indiana Library Federation =

Professional association for librarians in Indiana

- Nickname: ILF
- Formation: December 30, 1891; 134 years ago
- Tax ID no.: 35-1389309
- Parent organization: American Library Association
- Website: www.ilfonline.org

The Indiana Library Federation (ILF) is a professional organization for Indiana's librarians, library workers, and trustees. It is headquartered in Indianapolis, Indiana. The ILF was created as a result of the Indiana Library Association (501(c)(6) being merged into the Indiana Library Trustee Association (501(c)(3) in 1990. The two organizations often had conferences together and merged to take advantage of ILTA's tax-exempt status.

== Indiana Library Association ==
The Indiana Library Association was formed as the Library Association of Indiana in 1891. The organization's name was changed to the Indiana Library Association in 1897. E. M. Thomson was the association's first president.

== Indiana Library Trustee Association ==
The Indiana Library Trustee Association is an association for public library board members, within the Indiana Library Federation. The organization started holding regular meetings in 1908.

== Federation ==
ILF is made up of four affiliates.

- Indiana Public Library Association (IPLA)
- Association of Indiana School Library Educators (AISLE)
- Indiana Academic Library Association (IALA)
- Indiana Library Trustee and Supporter Association (ILSTA)

== Young Hoosier Book Award ==
The Young Hoosier Book Award (YHBA) is an annual book award given by the Indiana Library Federation. It is divided into three categories: Picture Books (kindergarten through second grade), Intermediate (third through fifth grade), and Middle Grade (sixth through eighth grade). It encourages self-selected reading among elementary and middle school/junior high school children. Indiana students vote for their favorite among the 20 nominees in each category.

It gave its first award in 1975, to The Trumpet of the Swan by E. B. White. The YHBAs added the Intermediate and Middle Grade categories in 1986, and the Picture Book category in 1992.

The most recent winners (2023 - 2024) were There's a Ghost in This House by Oliver Jeffers (Picture Book), What Comes Next by Rob Buyea (Intermediate), and Alone by Megan E. Freeman (Middle Grade).

== See also ==
- List of libraries in the United States
