= Because of Mr. Terupt =

2010 debut children's novel by Rob Buyea

- First edition
- Author: Rob Buyea
- Language: English
- Genre: Children's Fiction
- Publisher: Delacorte Books
- Publication date: October 11, 2010
- Publication place: United States
- Media type: Print (hardback, paperback)
- Pages: 268
- Followed by: Mr. Terupt Falls Again

Because of Mr. Terupt is the 2010 debut children's novel by Rob Buyea. Told through the eyes of seven students, it is about one year in the life of a fifth-grade class and their new teacher at the fictitious Snow Hill School.

== Plot ==
As the school year opens, the fifth-grade class of Snow Hill School in Connecticut meets the new teacher, Mr. Terupt. Their reactions to him can vary. Peter, the class clown, tries to see what he can get away with and is impressed when Mr. Terupt is cool about correcting his behavior. Having moved from California because her parents have just divorced, Jessica appreciates the way he relates to her since he is also new, and Anna, who tries to stay in the background because her mother is a social outcast, likes the way he subtly draws her into class discussions. Luke is the most studious and always has great grades, so he appreciates the creative class projects Mr. Terupt devises, while the more morose Jeffrey just hopes to be ignored. Alexia is too concerned with manipulating the other girls to pay much attention to the new teacher and Danielle is too worried about being manipulated by Alexia.

After a while, all of the students warm up to Mr. Terupt, who has a way of engaging everyone and making them want to do better. He even gives them a party day as a reward to reaching certain goals and gets Mrs. Williams, the principal, to agree to let the class go outside to play in the snow on their reward day. When a game of roughhousing goes too far, Mr. Terupt is hit with an icy snowball and goes into a coma, having previously sustained a number of concussions as a high school and college wrestler.

The accident has a dramatic impact on all the students, who worry about the role they played; however, it soon becomes obvious that the teacher's influence on them continues even when he is unable to interact with them. Jeffrey, who has long felt guilty because his stem cell and bone marrow donations were unable to save his brother's life, finally reaches out to his grieving parents and tries to put his family together again. Alexia comes to terms with the events that have caused her to lie in order to manipulate and control others and learns to be a true friend, and Peter learns that students with learning disabilities are sometimes wiser than those in the school's "regular" classrooms.

As the school year draws to a close, the students reflect on how they have benefited from Mr. Terupt's influence and are thrilled when he arrives at school on the last day and the principal announces that he will be their teacher again in sixth grade.

== Reception ==
Kirkus Reviews gave a positive review, saying "No one is perfect in this feel-good story, but everyone benefits, including sentimentally inclined readers." Publishers Weekly also had a positive review, calling the book "skillfully constructed."

The novel was a 2011 Middle Reader Honor Awards book of the E.B. White Read Aloud Award. It received the 2013 Young Hoosier Book Award (Intermediate).

== Sequels ==
- Mr. Terupt Falls Again, 2012
- Saving Mr. Terupt, 2015
- Goodbye, Mr. Terupt, 2020
