= Marion E. Coville =

American educator and writer (1870–1960)

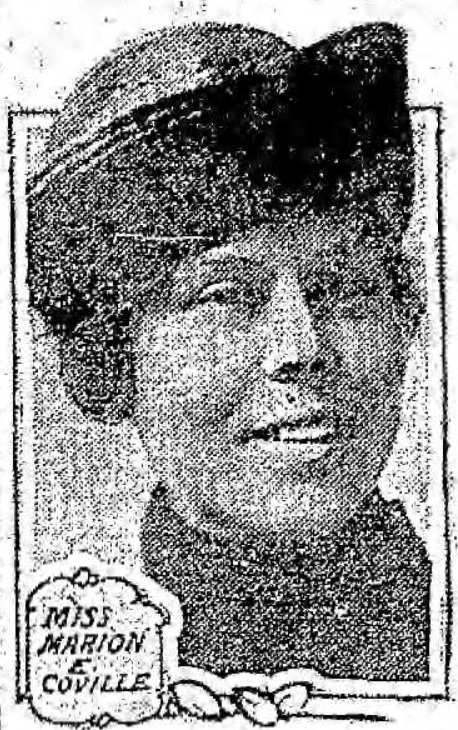
- Coville in 1920
- Born: Marion Elizabeth Coville; February 22, 1870; New York, U.S.
- Died: June 5, 1960 (aged 90); San Diego, California, U.S.
- Other name: Marion Elizabeth Coville Hansen
- Education: Syracuse University
- Occupations: Educator; writer; activist; composer; musician; philanthropist
- Organizations: Kappa Kappa Gamma; Socialist Party of America
- Notable work: An Appeal Against Slaughter (1914)
- Spouse: Rasmus M. Hansen (m. 1926)

Marion Elizabeth Coville Hansen (born Marion Elizabeth Coville; February 22, 1870 – June 5, 1960) was an American educator, writer, activist, composer, musician, and philanthropist. She taught music and later worked in education and nursing. A member of Kappa Kappa Gamma for 72 years, she was also active in vegetarian advocacy. Her 1914 book An Appeal Against Slaughter argued against killing animals for food and clothing on scriptural and ethical grounds.

== Biography ==
=== Early life and education ===
Marion Elizabeth Coville was born in New York on February 22, 1870. Her parents were Orson Coville, a businessman and Civil War veteran, and Marion L. Coville (née McDonald).

Coville pledged to Kappa Kappa Gamma at the age of 16 before enrolling at Syracuse University, where she studied music. Her studies were interrupted by an accident that required a prolonged hospital stay, and she did not immediately return to college.

=== Vegetarianism activism ===
Coville later said that seeing a chicken killed during her childhood affected her views on animals. A later visit to stockyards and her study of the human need for animal products also influenced her decision to adopt a vegetarian diet around 1904. She argued that vegetables could meet human nutritional needs, and she avoided animal-derived clothing where possible, including leather, wool, fur, and animal-based shoe materials.

Coville briefly avoided foods containing animal products, including butter and lard, but later returned to a vegetarian diet because of difficulties obtaining suitable food. She continued to avoid animal by-products in other areas of her life.

A 1920 newspaper profile stated that Coville's family did not oppose her vegetarianism, but treated her views with amusement.

==== An Appeal Against Slaughter ====
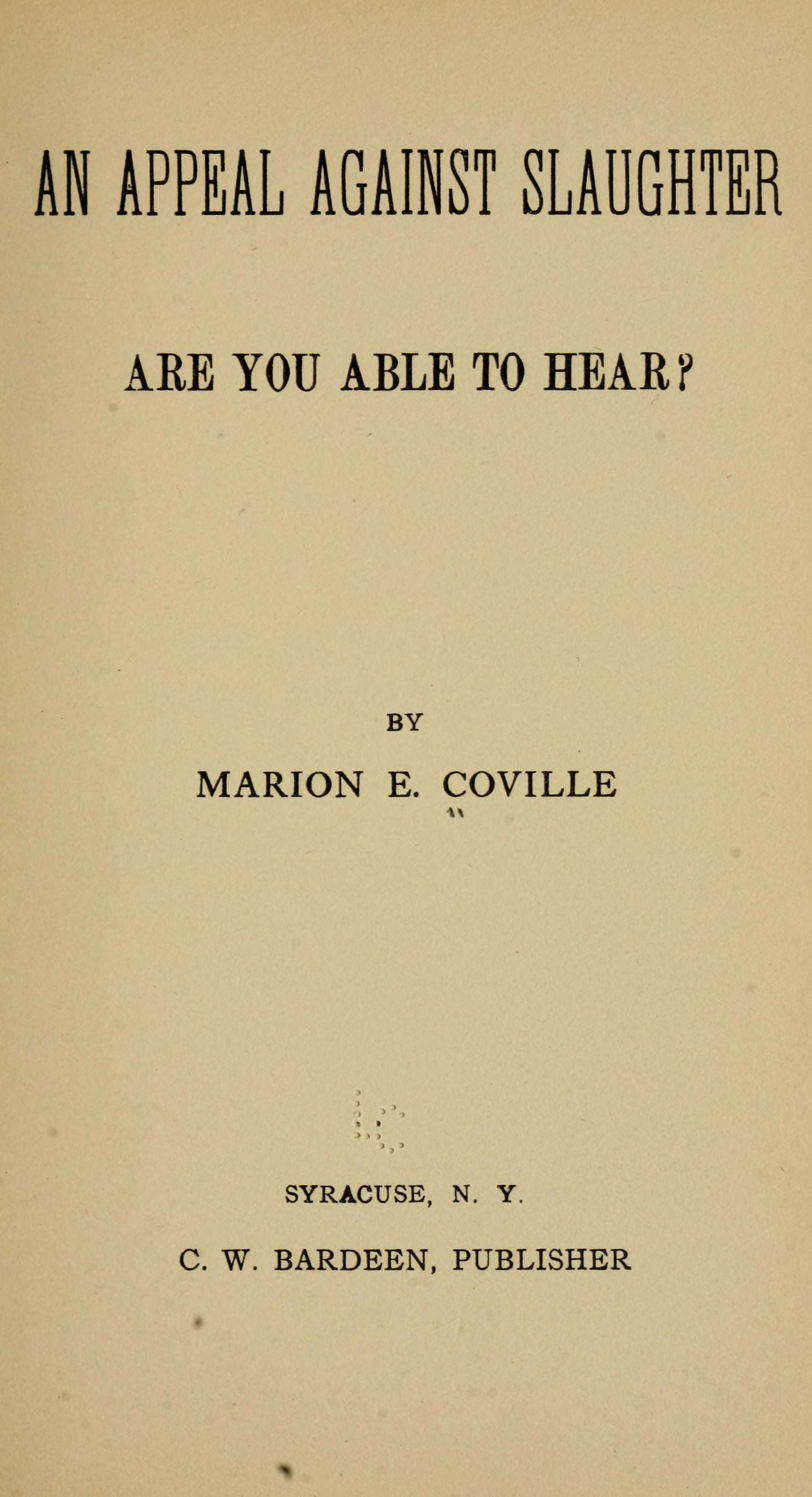
Title page of An Appeal Against Slaughter, 1914

In 1914, Coville published An Appeal Against Slaughter: Are You Able to Hear? The book criticised the killing of animals for food and clothing, using scriptural and ethical arguments. Coville described slaughter as cruel and opposed to a civilised society. A review in the Journal of Education described the book as an appeal for reform and vegetarianism. The book went through at least three editions.

==== Other activities ====
Coville authored the pamphlet Carnivorous and Predatory Living Exposed in response to inquiries from Christian Scientists. In it, she argued against meat consumption on moral, health, and ethical grounds.

Coville taught vegetarian cookery classes at her home. A 1916 report stated that the classes were intended to help participants avoid holiday meat and to encourage kindness toward animals.

=== Career and later education ===
After working with her father in a merchandising brokerage business and teaching music, Hansen returned to formal education at the age of 48. She studied for a science degree at Syracuse University, saying that further education would help her express her beliefs. She was also politically active and ran as a Socialist Party candidate for county superintendent of the poor in 1920.

She graduated from the Syracuse University School of Education four years later and taught in public and private schools. In 1924, Hansen moved to La Jolla, California, where she continued to work in education. During the Great Depression, she gave away much of her estate and entered nursing. She was also a composer and songwriter.

=== Later life ===
In later life, Hansen continued philanthropic work. According to Kappa Kappa Gamma, she regularly folded paper into towels for the Visiting Nurse Service of New York and continued writing. The organisation later identified her as its oldest member and dedicated its yearbook to her on Founders' Day.

=== Personal life and death ===
Coville was associated with Royal Evaungeal Fox, a family friend for whom she was described as secretary and nanny. Jack Major states that she was also alleged to have been Fox's mistress, and that her presence in the household was raised by Fox's third wife, Jenny, during their legal separation. In 1926, Coville married Rasmus M. Hansen.

Coville died in San Diego, California on June 5, 1960.

== Publications ==
- An Appeal Against Slaughter (Syracuse, New York: C. W. Bardeen, 1914)
- Carnivorous and Predatory Living Exposed (c. 1920)

== See also ==
- Christian vegetarianism
- History of vegetarianism
- Women and animal advocacy
- Women and vegetarianism and veganism advocacy
