= Vince Vawter =

American-born author and illustrator

- Born: Vilas Vincent Vawter III; Paris, Tennessee
- Education: Harding Academy of Memphis
- Occupations: Writer, Illustrator
- Writing career
- Genre: Children
- Notable work: Paperboy
- Website: www.vincevawter.com

Vilas Vincent Vawter III, better known as Vince Vawter, is an American-born author and illustrator. He worked in the newspaper business for forty years, retiring with the title of president and publisher of the Evansville (Ind.) Courier & Press. His debut novel Paperboy received a Newbery Honor in 2014.

== Bibliography ==
- Paperboy (2013)
- Copyboy (2014)
