= Rob Buyea =

American novelist (born 1976)

- Born: September 12, 1976 (age 49)
- Education: Syracuse University (BS); Syracuse University School of Education (MA)
- Occupations: Writer, educator
- Children: 3
- Writing career
- Genre: Children's fiction (ages 9-14)
- Website: robbuyea.com

Rob Buyea (born September 12, 1976) is an American children's fiction author best known for his Mr. Terupt series of novels. In 2011, Buyea won an E.B. White Read Aloud Award for Because of Mr. Terupt.

Buyea attended Syracuse University, from which he earned a Bachelor of Science in biology from the College of Arts and Sciences (1999) and a Master of Arts in education from the School of Education (2000). He was a wrestler on the Syracuse Orange team.

He is now a full time author, residing with his wife, three children, and two dogs in North Andover, Massachusetts.

== Bibliography ==
- Because of Mr. Terupt (2010)
- Mr. Terupt Falls Again (2012)
- Saving Mr. Terupt (2015)
- The Perfect Score (2017)
- Voices Rising From The Classroom (2018)
- The Perfect Secret (2018)
- The Perfect Star (2019)
- Goodbye, Mr. Terupt (2020)
- What Comes Next (2021)
- The Daredevils (2022)
- Carter Avery's Tricky Fourth-Grade Year (2024)
