= ProServ =

American sports management firm

- Company type: Private
- Industry: Sports management
- Founded: 1970
- Founder: Donald Dell
- Defunct: 1997
- Fate: Acquired and merged
- Successor: Marquee Group then SFX Sports Group then Clear Channel Entertainment
- Headquarters: Washington D.C., United States
- Key people: Donald Dell (Former CEO)
- Products: Athlete management, event production
- Services: Marketing, Management
- Parent: SFX Sports Group

Professional Services., (ProServ) was an American sports management firms that was one of the first to do so. Initially focused on tennis, the company would grow to become among the world's largest sports marketing, athlete management, event production, and TV companies.

== History ==
Donald Dell became the first sports agent in tennis when he founded the Law Offices of Donald Dell in 1970. His first clients were Arthur Ashe and Stan Smith, his former teammates on the undefeated 1968 and 1969 U.S. Davis Cup teams. After adding partners, the name of the firm became Dell, Craighill, Fentress, and Benton. In 1976, the firm started ProServ to handle athlete recruiting and marketing.

At its peak, ProServ had 16 offices around the world with 300 employees and represented more than 200 professional athletes and coaches, including Michael Jordan, Patrick Ewing, James Worthy, Stan Smith, Arthur Ashe, Pete Sampras, Stefan Edberg, Nancy Kerrigan, Gabriela Sabatini and Jimmy Connors. The company also managed and promoted professional sporting events and created ProServ Television to handle sports television production and rights representation.

ProServ Television created and produced thirty pre- and post- Olympic shows in 1984 as well as many sporting events. ProServ Television created the Emmy Award-winning documentary A Hard Road to Glory, with Arthur Ashe, about the history of black athletes in America. ProServ represented the USTA in the sale and distribution of the international television rights to the U.S. Open for many years, and represented the French Federation of Tennis for the American television rights for the French Open.

Through the 1990s, ProServ expanded into football, golf, baseball, figure skating, gymnastics, and also became heavily involved with beach volleyball and the original AVP Tour.

ProServ was one of the first agencies to negotiate the naming rights for stadiums such as FedEx Field, M&T Bank, and Philips Arena.

=== Acquisition ===
ProServ was acquired in 1997 by The Marquee Group, which in turn was acquired in 1999 by SFX Sports Group (itself now a subsidiary of Clear Channel Entertainment).

== See also ==
- Octagon (sports agency)
