= Syracuse University School of Education =

Education school at Syracuse University

Coordinates: 43°02′29″N 76°08′07″W

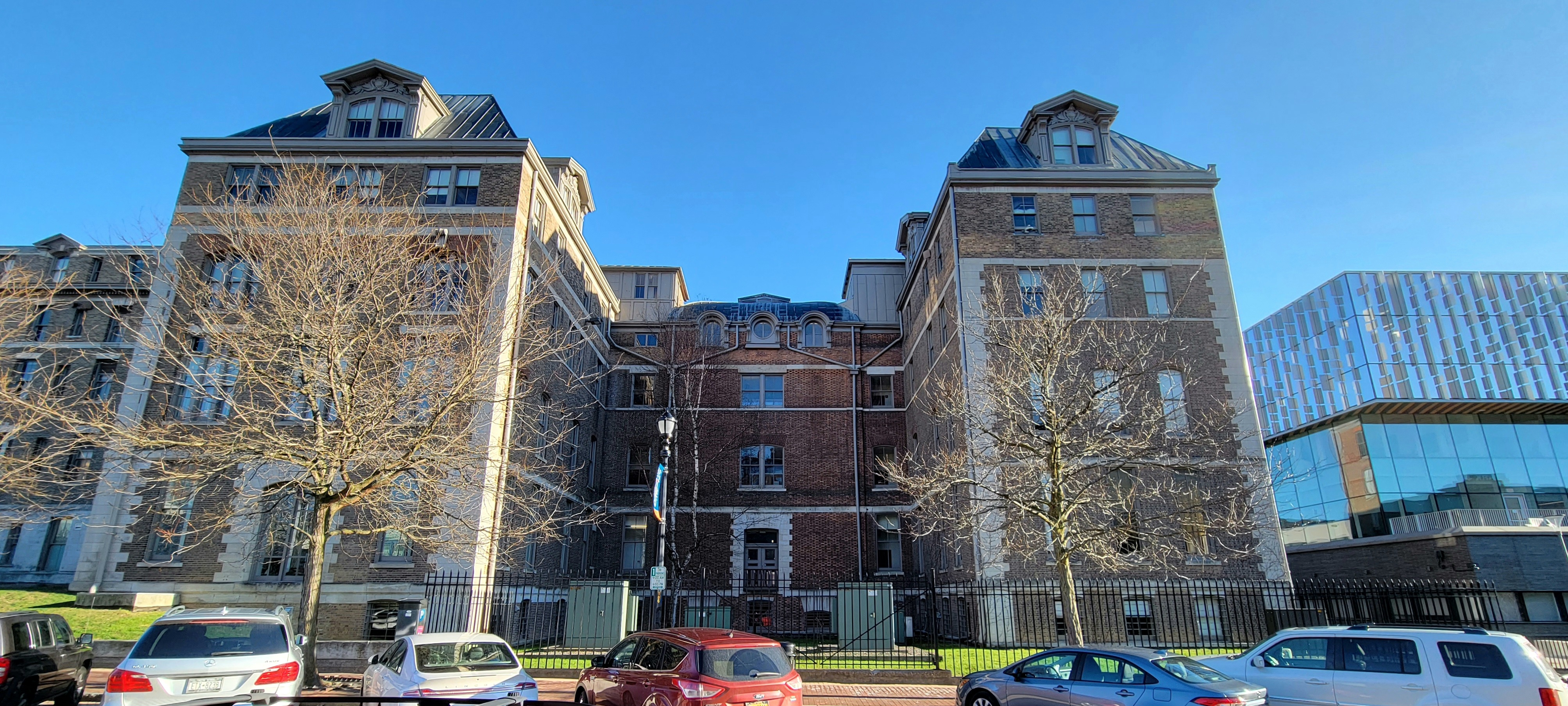
- Huntington Hall (as seen from Marshall Street)
- Former name: Margaret Olivia Slocum Teachers’ College
- Type: Private
- Established: 1906; 120 years ago
- Parent institution: Syracuse University
- Accreditation: AAQEP
- Dean: Kelly Chandler-Olcott
- Location: Syracuse, New York, United States
- Campus: Urban
- Website: soe.syr.edu

Syracuse University School of Education is the education school of Syracuse University in Syracuse, New York. Founded in 1906, the school is dedicated to training highly skilled and knowledgeable practitioners, teachers, administrators, counselors, and scholars. The school offers bachelor's, master's, and doctoral degree programs, as well as Certificates of Advanced Study, in elementary education, higher education, social work, special education, school counseling, and educational leadership.

== History ==
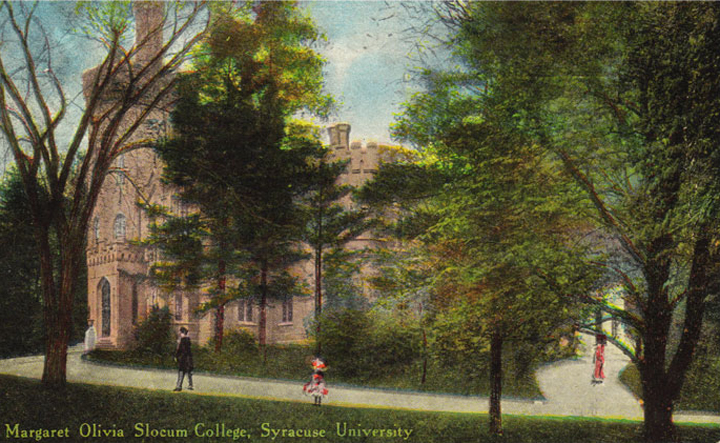
The Margaret Olivia Slocum Teacher's College (Yates Castle) hosted the school from 1906 until 1934.

Prior to the establishment of the school, Syracuse University offered classes through the Department of Philosophy to train students interested in becoming teachers. In 1906, Margaret Olivia Slocum Sage, a philanthropist, former teacher, and wife of financier Russell Sage, gifted the now demolished Yates Castle along with a generous endowment to the university and officially established the Margaret Olivia Slocum Teachers’ College of Syracuse University.

In 1931, a Student Dean Program was inaugurated by Dean of Women Eugenie A. Leonard, to train women to become educational leaders. The program later becomes co-educational and evolves into the school's Higher Education program.

After decades of growth, the school was renamed Syracuse University School of Education under the leadership of Dean Harry Ganders in 1934.

In 1946, the school pioneered a Special Education program that applied progressive views to teaching people with various disabilities. Much of this program was housed in the Hoople Center for Special Education, which, when it opened in 1953, was one of only five such facilities on a university campus in the United States.

In 1948, the school created one of the nation’s first graduate programs in instructional technology, called Audio-Visual Education. This program evolved into Instructional Design, Development, and Evaluation.

Opened by Burton Blatt in 1971, the Center on Human Policy was in part a response to widespread discrimination against people with disabilities in society. It is the “first national institute for the study and creation of open, inclusion settings.”

Among the school's other notable achievements in special education and inclusive schooling, it created the first graduate disability studies program, the first joint degree in law and disability studies, the first fully integrated inclusive education program offered at a research university, and is among the first teachers’ colleges in the United States to offer a dual certification (general and inclusive) adolescent teacher preparation program.

In 2025, The School of Social Work joined the School of Education from the David B. Falk College of Sport.

=== List of Deans ===
- Jacob Richard Street 1906-1917
- Mark E. Penney 1917-1920
- Albert S. Hurst 1920-1929
- Harry S. Ganders 1930-1953
- Virgil M. Rogers 1953-1963
- Robert C. Stewart 1963-1965 (Acting)
- David R. Krathwohl 1965-1976
- Burton Blatt 1976-1985
- Harold Herber 1985-1986 (Interim)
- Joan Burstyn 1986-1989
- Philip Doughty 1989-1990 (Interim)
- Steven T. Bossert 1990-2000
- Corinne Roth Smith 2000-2002 (Interim)
- Emily Robertson 2002-2003 (Interim)
- Louise C. Wilkinson 2003-2005
- Douglas P. Biklen 2005-2014
- Joanna O. Masingila 2014-2015 (Interim)
- Joanna O. Masingila 2015-2021
- Kelly Chandler-Olcott 2021-2023 (Interim)
- Kelly Chandler-Olcott 2023-present

=== Huntington Hall ===
Syracuse University School of Education's home is Huntington Hall, located on Marshall Street a few blocks north of Syracuse University's main campus. The building was formerly the Hospital of the Good Shepherd.

Among the 20 oldest hospitals in the United States, the Hospital of the Good Shepherd was founded in 1872 under Bishop Frederic D. Huntington. As a teaching hospital, it was the first in the United States to offer nursing education, along with Johns Hopkins, in 1885.

In 1915, the hospital was purchased by Syracuse University to be a part of its College of Medicine.

In 1965, patients of the now University Hospital of the Good Shepherd were transferred to the State University Upstate Medical Center Hospital (now Upstate Medical University). The former Good Shepherd hospital building was then converted to academic use and re-named for the hospital's founder. The School of Education fully re-located from other campus buildings in 1973.

Among several renovations, in 2013 the building's main entrance was re-established on Marshall Street.

== Academics ==
=== Undergraduate programs ===
The school offers several bachelor's degrees, including Inclusive Childhood Education, Inclusive Adolescent Education, Music Education, Selected Studies in Education, and Social Work.

=== Graduate programs ===
The school offers a wide range of graduate programs beyond training the next generation of teachers. For example, it currently provides master's degrees in Childhood Education, Clinical Mental Health Counseling, Higher Education, Literacy Education, Music Education, Social Work, and School Counseling, as well as doctoral degrees in Counseling and Counselor Education, Education, and Educational Leadership.
