= City Museum of Novi Sad =

- Музеј града Новог Сада; Muzej grada Novog Sada; Újvidéki Városi Múzeum; Múzeum mesta Nový Sad; Музей града Новог Сада
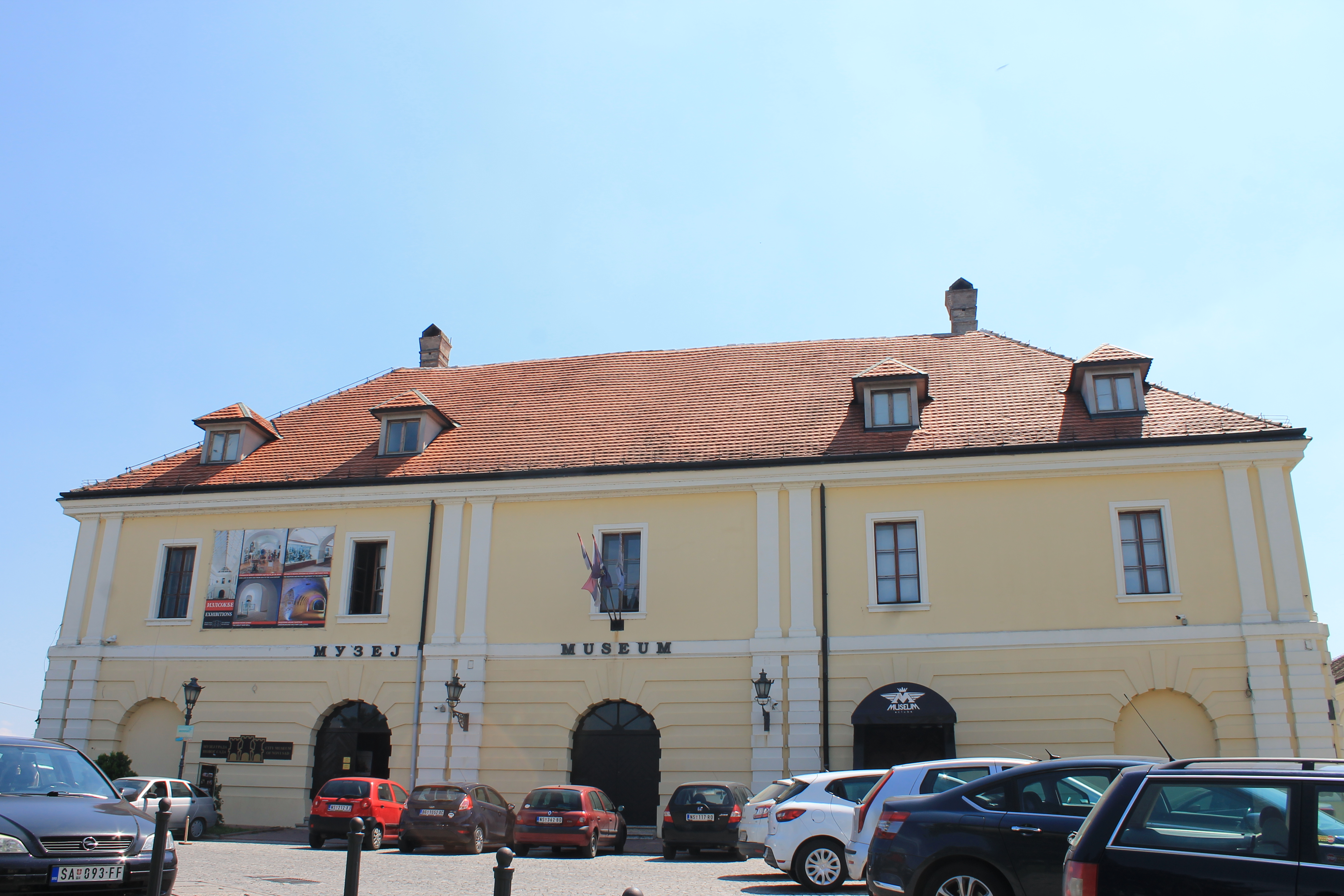
- The main building of the museum at the Petrovaradin Fortress
- Established: 1954; 72 years ago
- Location: Novi Sad, Vojvodina, Serbia
- Coordinates: 45.2522°N 19.8622°E
- Type: History museum
- Website: www.museumns.rs

The City Museum of Novi Sad (Serbian: Музеј града Новог Сада, Muzej grada Novog Sada; Hungarian: Újvidéki Városi Múzeum; Slovak: Múzeum mesta Nový Sad; Pannonian Rusyn: Музей града Новог Сада) founded in 1954, is a complex city museum focusing on Novi Sad's, capital of the province of Vojvodina in Serbia, development from its origins to the modern era. It consists of several departments, including Archaeology, History, Cultural History, Ethnology, and a Regional Gallery for contemporary art.

The museum includes several branches: the central building at the Upper Plateau of Petrovaradin Fortress, Zmaj Museum in Sremska Kamenica (since 1956), the Regional Collection in Sremski Karlovci (since 1963), and the Collection of Foreign Art in the legacy of Dr. Branko Ilić in Dunavska Street (since 1967). The central building of the museum is located at the upper plateau of Petrovaradin Fortress, in a structure known as the Topovnjača or Mamulina Barracks, built in 1775 as a one-story military barracks.

== History ==
The museum was established on 22 October 1954. Branko Ilić, a gynecologist and former mayor of Novi Sad (1936–1938), left a legacy of artistic works, furniture, and other valuables, which he donated to the city in 1966.

== See also ==
- List of museums in Serbia
- Museum of Vojvodina
- Museum of Contemporary Art of Vojvodina
