= National Museum of Čačak =

- Народни музеј Чачак; Narodni muzej Čačak

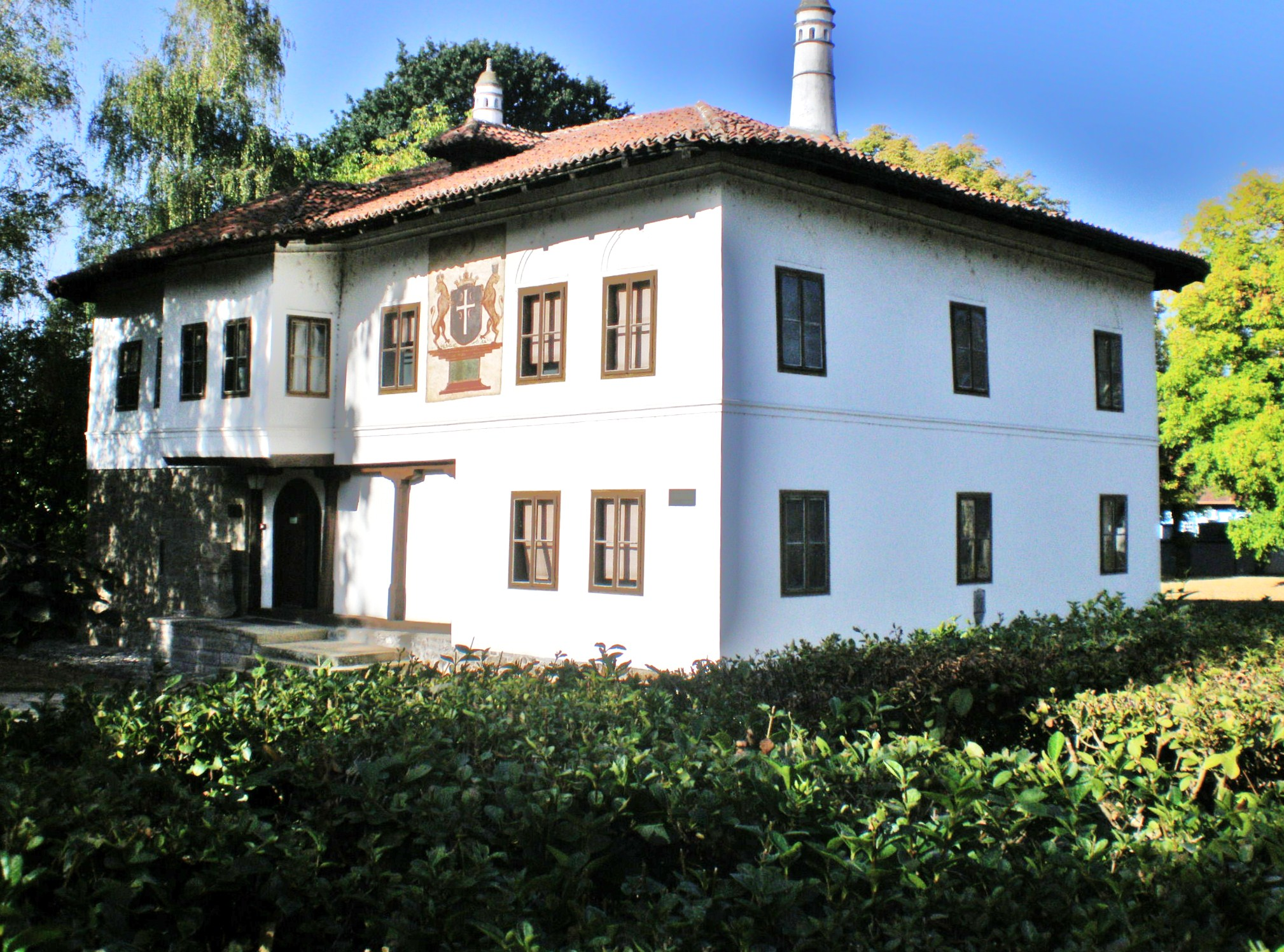
- Building of the National Museum
- Established: 1952; 74 years ago
- Location: Cara Dušana 1, 32000 Čačak, Serbia
- Coordinates: 43°53′37″N 20°20′55″E
- Type: History museum Art museum
- Director: Delfina Rajić
- Website: cacakmuzej.org.rs

The National Museum of Čačak (Serbian: Народни музеј Чачак) was founded in 1952 as the main museum in the city of Čačak in Serbia. The museum is organized into five departments that preserve a collection of nearly 20,000 artifacts. Since 1969, the museum has regularly published the Zbornik radova Narodnog muzeja journal and has released 89 catalogues along with 51 special editions, including monographs, conference proceedings and guides.

== History ==
The initial proposals for establishing a museum emerged in the interwar period in the Kingdom of Yugoslavia. Plans included repurposing Jovan Obrenović's Konak as an exhibition space and the city's official museum. In September 1940, the municipal authorities formally designated the building for this purpose. However, the onset of World War II and subsequent postwar developments postponed the museum's establishment.

The National Museum in Čačak was founded in the period after the end of World War II in Yugoslavia on August 30, 1952, by a decision of the People's Committee of the City Municipality of Čačak. The first director was ethnologist Slobodan Sanader, and the museum was officially opened for visitors in 1953. Until 2002 the museum hosted 238 exhibitions. Since 2005, the museum has been directed by Delfina Rajić, an art historian. In 2013, it was granted the status of a institution of national significance for the Republic of Serbia.

== See also ==
- List of museums in Serbia
- Memorial Ossuary, Čačak
- Konak (residence)
