= Raichle's Palace =

Building in Subotica, Serbia

- Палата Рајхл; Palata Rajhl; Raichle-palota
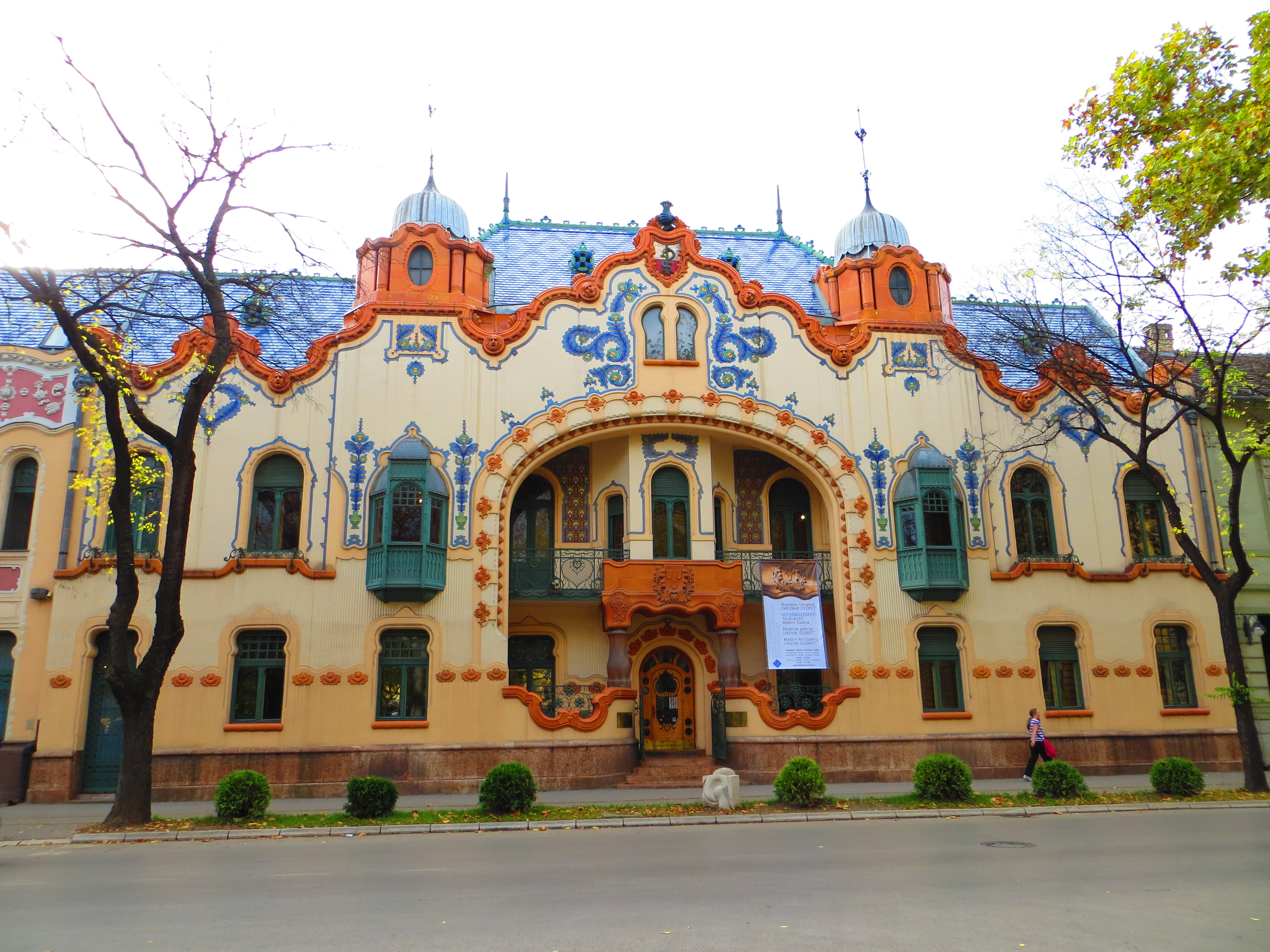
- Interactive map of the Raichle's Palace area

General information
- Architectural style: Art Nouveau
- Location: Park Ferenca Rajhla 5, Subotica, Serbia
- Coordinates: 46°06′05.51″N 19°40′07.14″E
- Completed: 1904; 122 years ago

Design and construction
- Architect: Ferenc Raichle

Cultural Heritage of Serbia
- Type: Cultural Monument of Great Importance
- Designated: 1997
- Reference no.: CK 1218

The Raichle's Palace (Serbian: Палата Рајхл, Palata Rajhl, Hungarian: Raichle-palota) is a historic building in Subotica, Vojvodina in northern Serbia. It is listed as a Cultural Monument of Great Importance.

The palace was designed in 1903 by architect Ferenc Raichle as a family residence, with space for his architectural office and additional rental apartments. At the time Subotica was a part of Austria-Hungary. Completed in 1904, the building is considered Raichle’s masterpiece and one of the most well known examples of Hungarian Secessionist (Art Nouveau) architecture in the region. The building houses the Gallery of Contemporary Art.

== Architecture ==
Designed without regard for architectural conventions of the time, Raichle integrated his personal vision and artistic freedom. The building uses the heart motif in numerous forms across the building. The stylized, inverted heart shape is visible in the recessed main entrance, the wrought iron gate, balcony railings, and throughout the ornamentation, rendered in various materials such as ceramics, Murano mosaic, wrought iron, carved wood, and stucco moldings.

The lower rounded heart-shaped forms are framed with ceramics from the Zsolnay factory in Pécs, Hungary, and include a floral wrought iron parapet. Flanking the entrance are two Tuscan marble columns supporting a closed loggia on the first floor, with balconies on each side.

== History ==
Ferenc Raichle, a trained architect from Budapest originally from Apatin, moved to Subotica after completing his studies and traveling across European capitals. He married Ilona Varga, daughter of prominent Subotica senator Károly Varga, and decided to settle in the city. Raichle initially lived in an apartment in the mansion of then-mayor Lazar Mamužić before commissioning his own residence. Ferenc Raichle chose a prominent site near the Subotica train station for his family residence and architectural office, ensuring that the building would be among the first landmarks seen by visitors arriving by rail.

His first project for the building was rejected by the city authorities for lacking sufficient grandeur. His revised design, approved and built in 1904, became one of the finest examples of Art Nouveau in Subotica. The layout of the rooms on the second floor is the same as on the first floor. The rooms on the third floor are located in the attic space. Above the building dominates a tower 76 meters high with an observation deck and a clock, originally equipped with light effects at the striking of the full hour.

Raichle family lived in the house only until 1908, when Ferenc Raichle filed for bankruptcy and moved to Szeged, with the house being confiscated by the bank. It was purchased by Theresia Hartman, who gave the house to her son József. At the outbreak of the Second World War, the house was inhabited by the Schossberger family, relatives of Theresia, and the family of Aleksandar Gavanki, an army friend of József. Andrew Sholl, son of Emil and Anna Schossberger, recalls,

Needless to say, my parents' apartment was not empty: it was crammed with gorgeous paintings (some from the 17th and 18th centuries...), furniture, antiques and Persian rugs.

In 1909, when the Great Terrace was designed, its working name was Café, restaurant, and ballroom. The construction of the Great Terrace was completed in July 1911. In 1948, the Municipal Museum of Subotica moved into the building, and in 1968 it became home to the Contemporary Art Gallery. All rooms were painted white and original wall paintings, wallpapers, and leather coverings were lost when the museum moved into the building.

== Protection ==
Raichle's Palace was first protected by a decision of the Provincial Institute for the Protection of Cultural Monuments in Novi Sad issued on 3 March 1973. This protection was later confirmed through the Official Gazette of the Autonomous Province of Vojvodina, no. 28/91. On 15 December 1997, the palace was officially listed in the Central Register of Cultural Monuments of the Republic of Serbia as a Cultural Monument of Great Importance (registry no. SK 1218). The building was reconstructed in period between 1982 and 1983 when it was transformed to follow the needs of the gallery while preserving its interior. Extensive conservation and restoration works were carried out between 2002 and 2005.

== Gallery ==
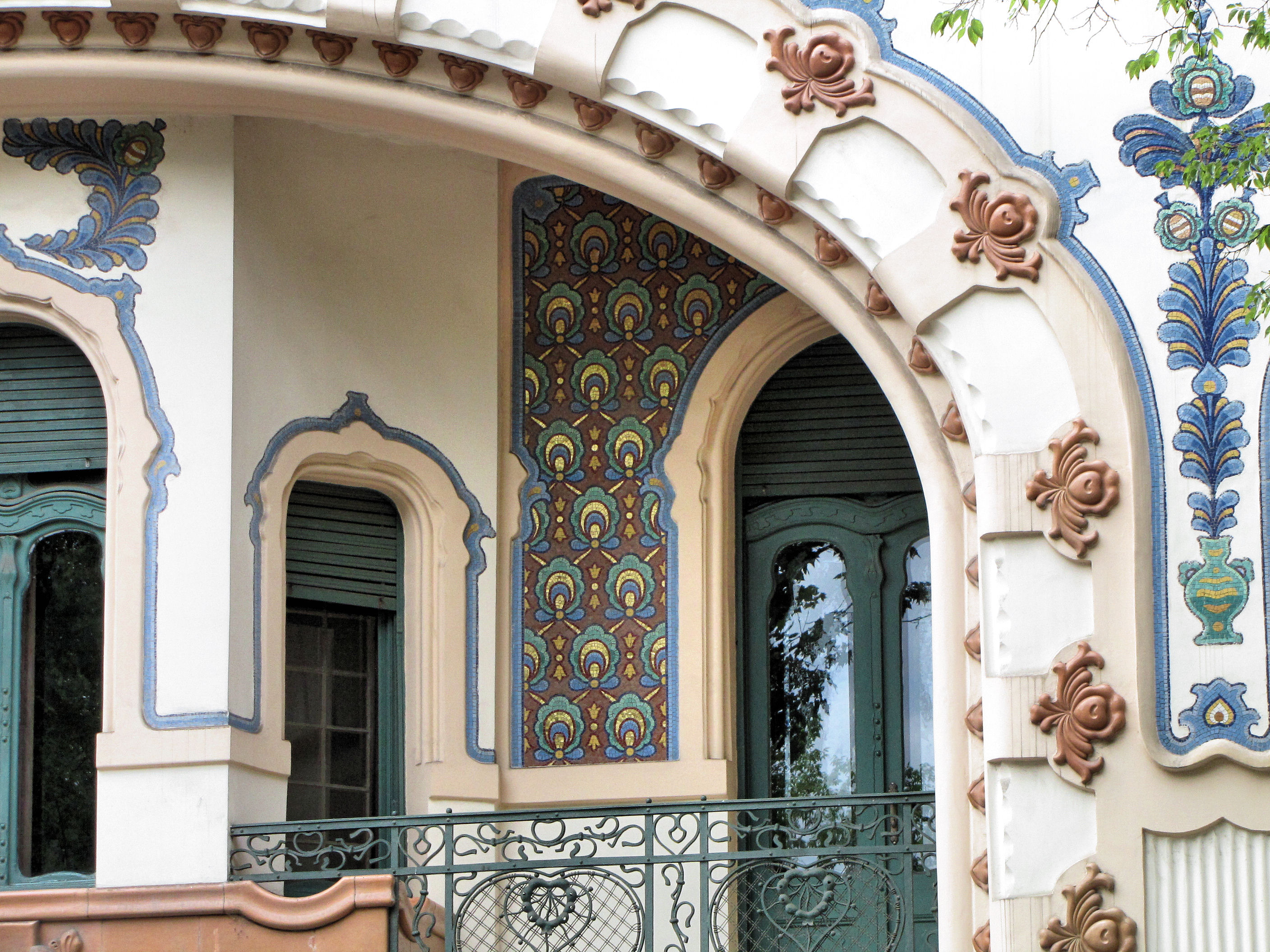

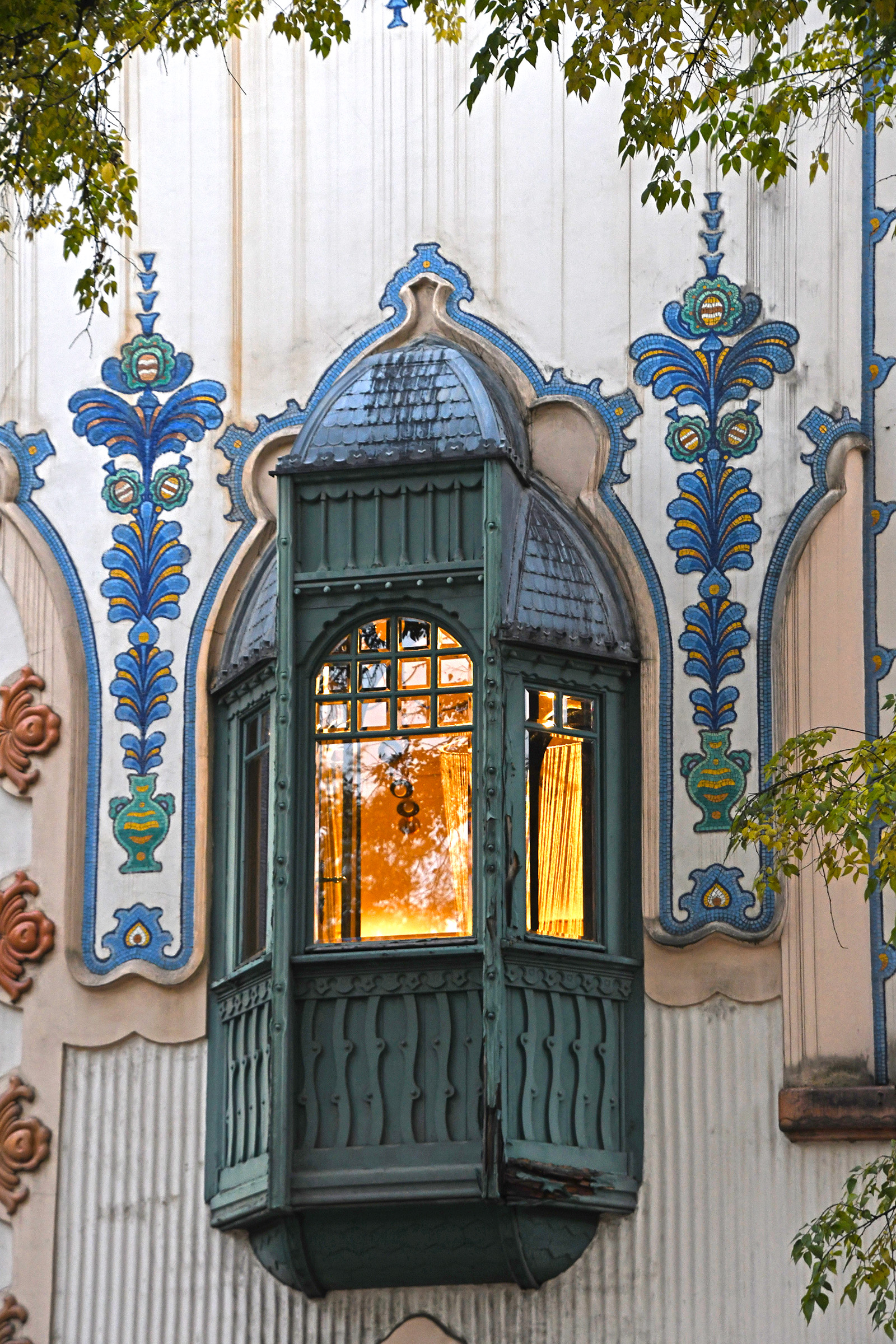

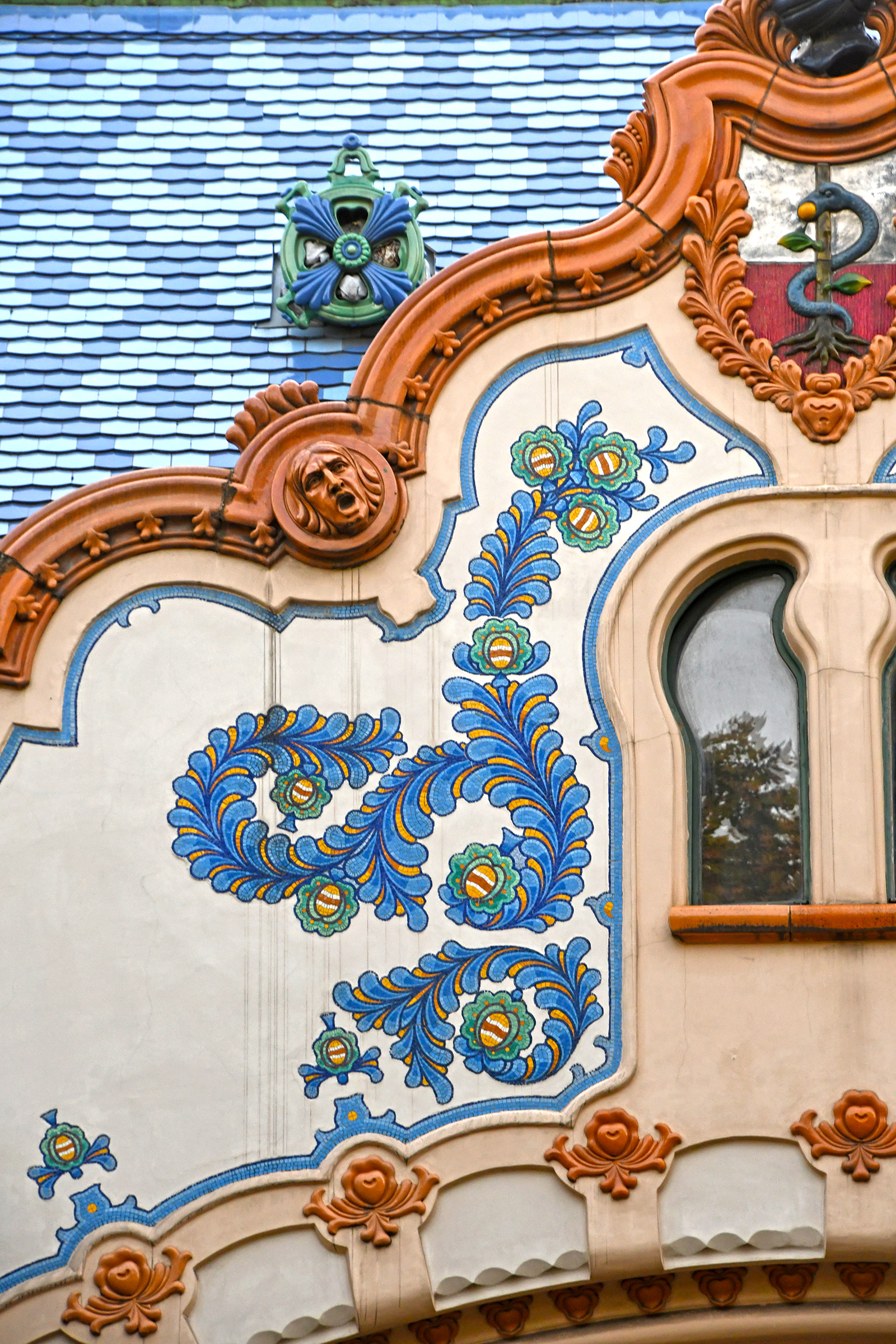

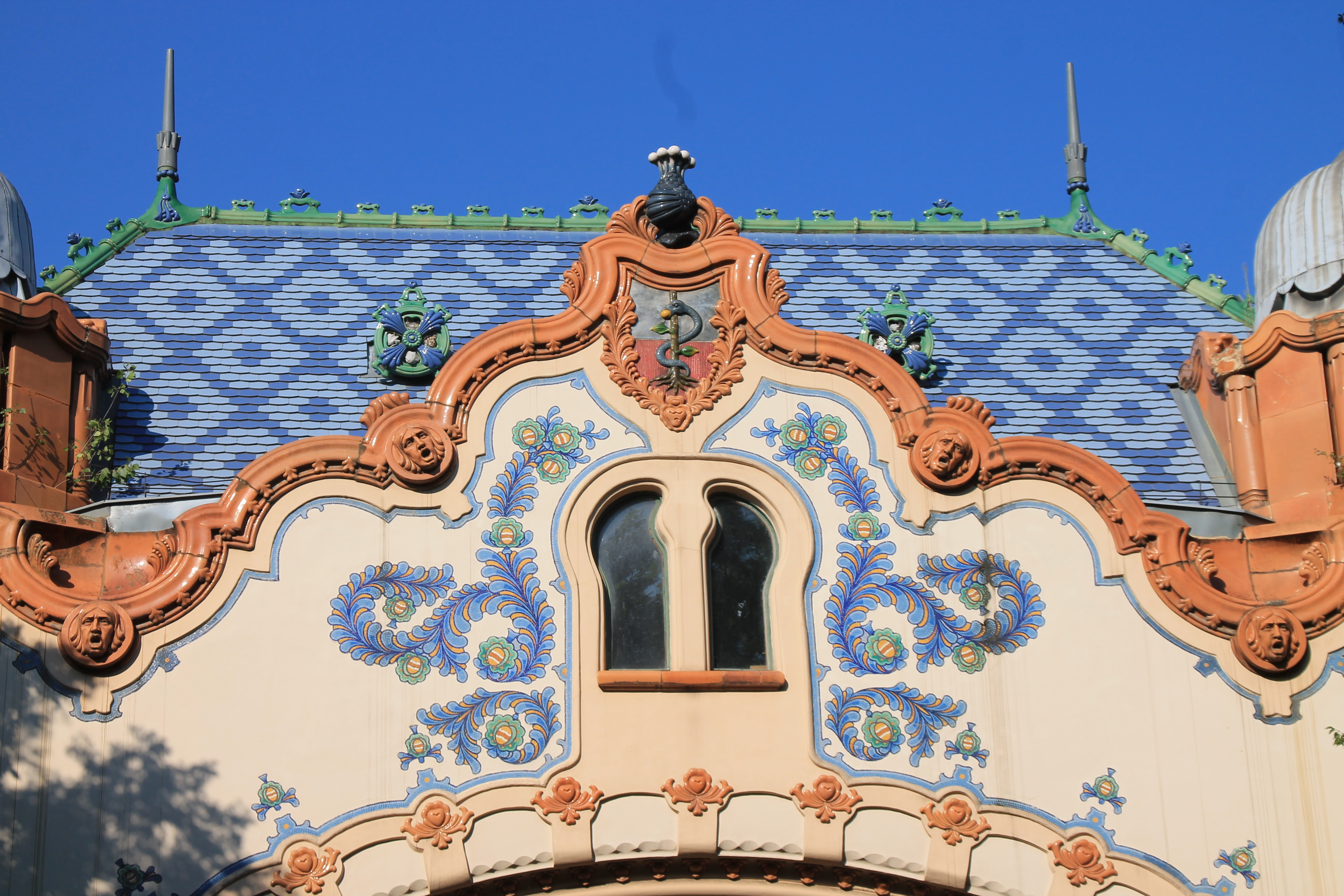

== See also ==
- Subotica Synagogue
- Subotica City Hall
