= Museum of Theatrical Arts of Serbia =

Museum of Theatrical Arts of Serbia Božić's House
- Музеј позоришне уметности Србије
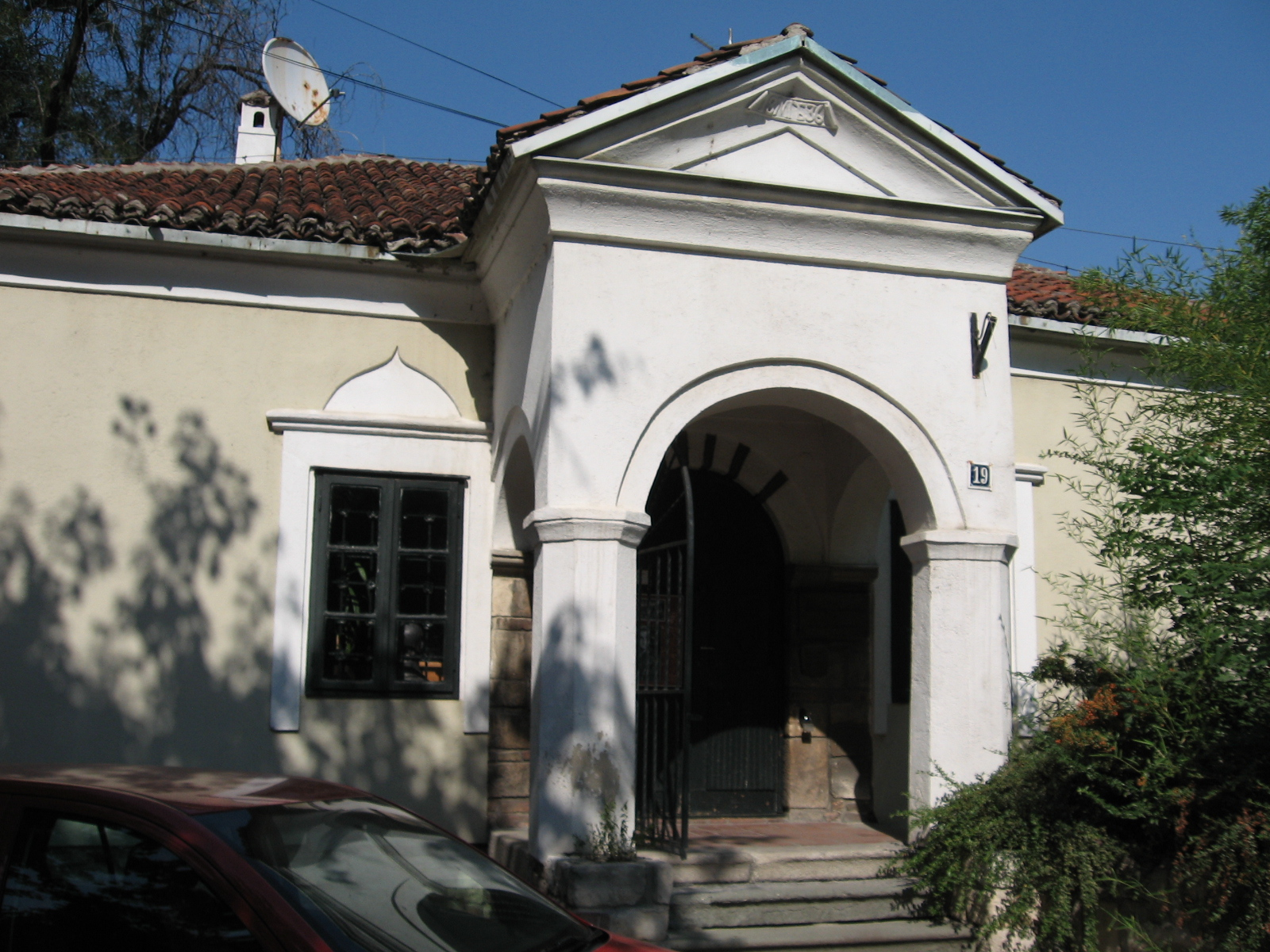
- View from outside
- Established: 28 November 1950; 75 years ago
- Location: Gospodar Jevremova 19, Belgrade, Serbia
- Coordinates: 44°49′17″N 20°27′31″E
- Type: art museum
- Website: www.mpus.org.rs

The Museum of Theatrical Arts of Serbia (Serbian Cyrillic: Музеј позоришне уметности Србије, Muzej pozorišne umetnosti Srbije) is a museum located in Belgrade, the capital of Serbia. The museum also contains a library and a historical archive.

The library contains pieces of Scenography, along with historical pictures and paintings.

== History ==
Museum was founded on 28 November 1950 under the decree of the Ministry for Science and Culture of Serbia. The idea of founding a Theatrical Arts museum began in 1901.

== Božić's House ==
The Museum of Theatrical Arts of Serbia is placed in Božić's House, which was built in 1836, for Belgrade merchant Miloje Božić. In 1979, House was placed on Monument of Culture of Great Importance protection list, and it is protected by Republic of Serbia.

== See also ==
- Monument of Culture of Great Importance
- Tourism in Serbia
- List of museums in Serbia
