= Memorial Museum of Nadežda and Rastko Petrović =

Museum in Belgrade, Serbia

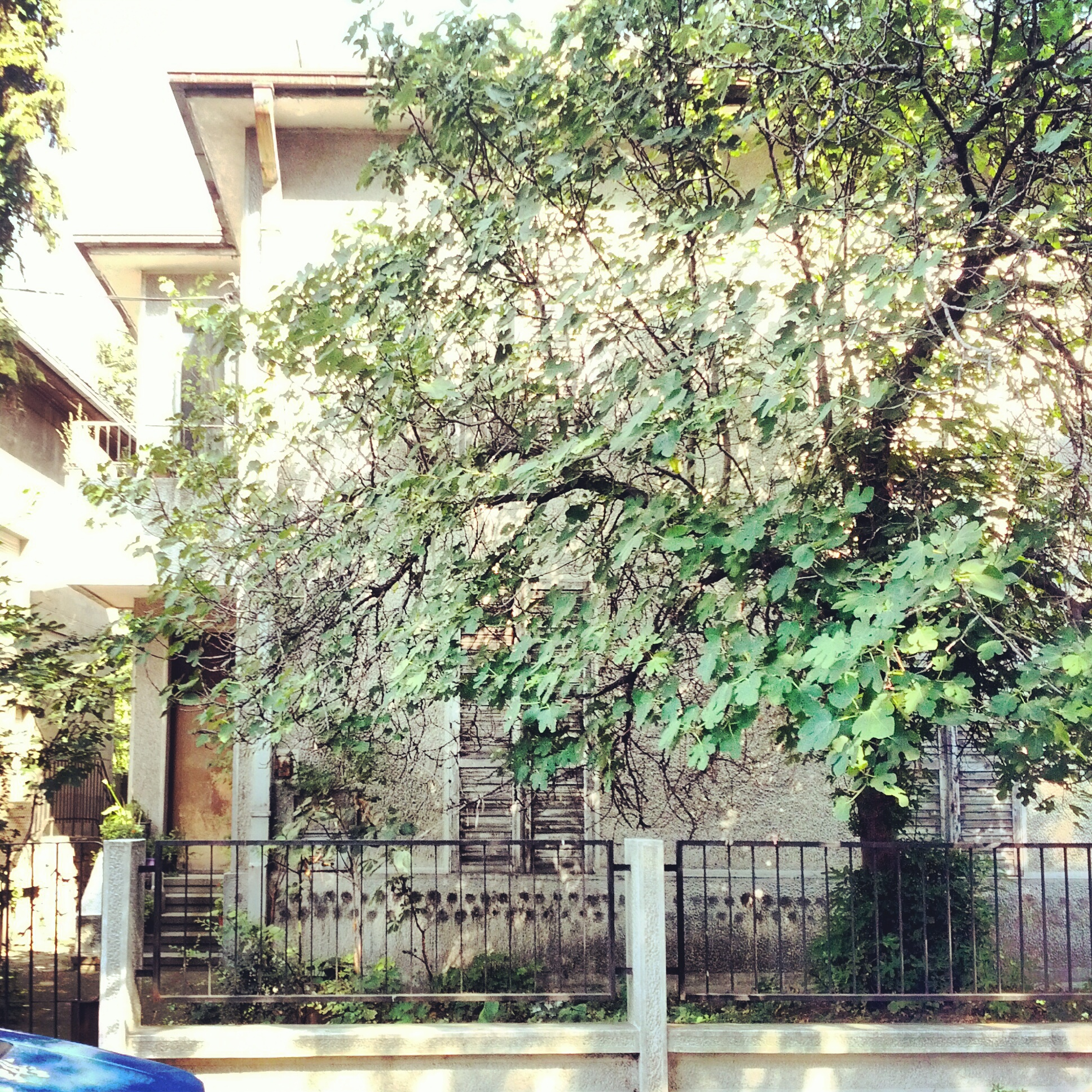
- Memorial Museum of Nadežda and Rastko Petrović
- Interactive map of Memorial Museum of Nadežda and Rastko Petrović
- Location: Belgrade, Serbia
- Coordinates: 44°48′52″N 20°28′44″E
- Type: Cultural monument
- Dedicated to: Nadežda Petrović and Rastko Petrović
- Website: http://beogradskonasledje.rs/

Memorial Museum of Nadežda and Rastko Petrović is a memorial museum located in Belgrade, the capital of Serbia. It was declared a cultural monument in 1974 by the decision of the Institute for the Protection of Cultural Monuments from 1974.

Memorial Museum is located in a family house of the Belgrade artist Ljubica Luković, sister of Nadežda and Rastko Petrović. The house was built in the period from 1928 to 1935 as a typical house of the Professors' colony. Fixed assets consist of the house and the land around the house.

The exhibition of the museum today consists of the rich legacy of the Petrović family, related to the life and work of Mito Petrović (1852–1911), writer and scholar, painter Nadežda Petrović (1873–1915) and writer Rastko Petrović (1898–1949), which was collected and donated to the National Museum in Belgrade by Ljubica Luković. The museum contains a collection of paintings and sketches of Nadežda Petrović, private correspondence of family members, a collection of works of art and objects that belonged to Rastko Petrović, travel films, records and other items.

The renovated and newly reopened museum was officially opened on May 15th 2025 by the Minister of Culture Nikola Selaković, after being closed for 39 years.

== See more ==
- National Museum in Belgrade
- Nadežda Petrović
- Rastko Petrović
- List of museums in Serbia
