= Museum of Srem =

- Музеј Срема; Muzej Srema

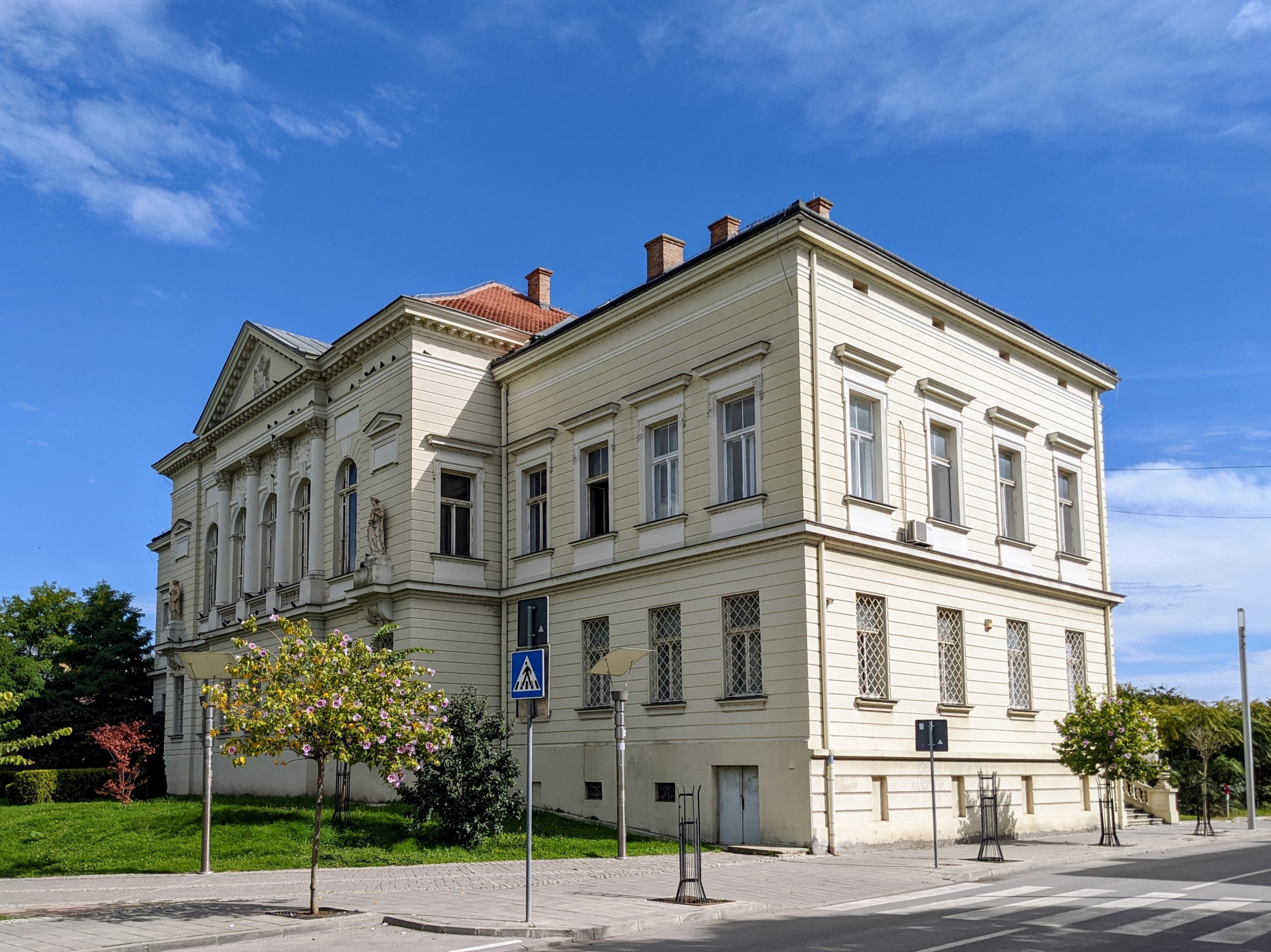
- The main building of the museum
- Established: 1946; 80 years ago
- Location: Sremska Mitrovica, Serbia
- Coordinates: 44.9674°N 19.6090°E
- Type: History museum Art museum
- Website: muzejsrema.com

The Museum of Srem (Serbian: Музеј Срема / Muzej Srema) in Sremska Mitrovica is the city institution focused on the research, preservation and presentation of historical objects and artifacts related to the Syrmia region. The museum was officially established in 1946 under the name of the City Museum of Sremska Mitrovica shortly after the end of World War II in Yugoslavia and the liberation from the Axis occupation of Vojvodina.

The founding of the museum was closely linked to archaeological findings from the Roman city of Sirmium. The museum initially opened as the Museum of Church Art on May 1, 1946, focusing on rich religious heritage of the city. By November 23, 1946, it became a comprehensive museum with archaeological, ethnographic, historical, art, and natural history collections. The museum's first exhibition opened to the public on May 31, 1948, while the current name of the institution was introduced in 1952.

== History ==
The need to establish a museum in Sremska Mitrovica arose in the second half of the 19th century, as many artifacts from the ancient city of Sirmium were being transferred to other museums in cities like Zagreb, Budapest and Vienna. In 1869, the researcher Feliks Kanitz initiated the formation of the "Sirmium" society, aiming to collect old monuments and lay the groundwork for a museum. The museum was first established in June 1885 by the city's mayor Ćira pl. Milekić, although it did not initially have a permanent location. Roman stone monuments were at the time displayed in the city park. The Museum of Church Art was the first to open in the Old Serbian Church. The Church Art museum was at the time one of the first of its kind in Democratic Federative Yugoslavia and opened formally on June 30, 1946. The establishment of the church art museum was followed by the founding of the City Museum on November 23, 1946. In November 1946, the Museum of Church Art was integrated into the City Museum, with Branko Vasilić, an architect and voluntary associate, playing a key role in its development.

== Gallery ==
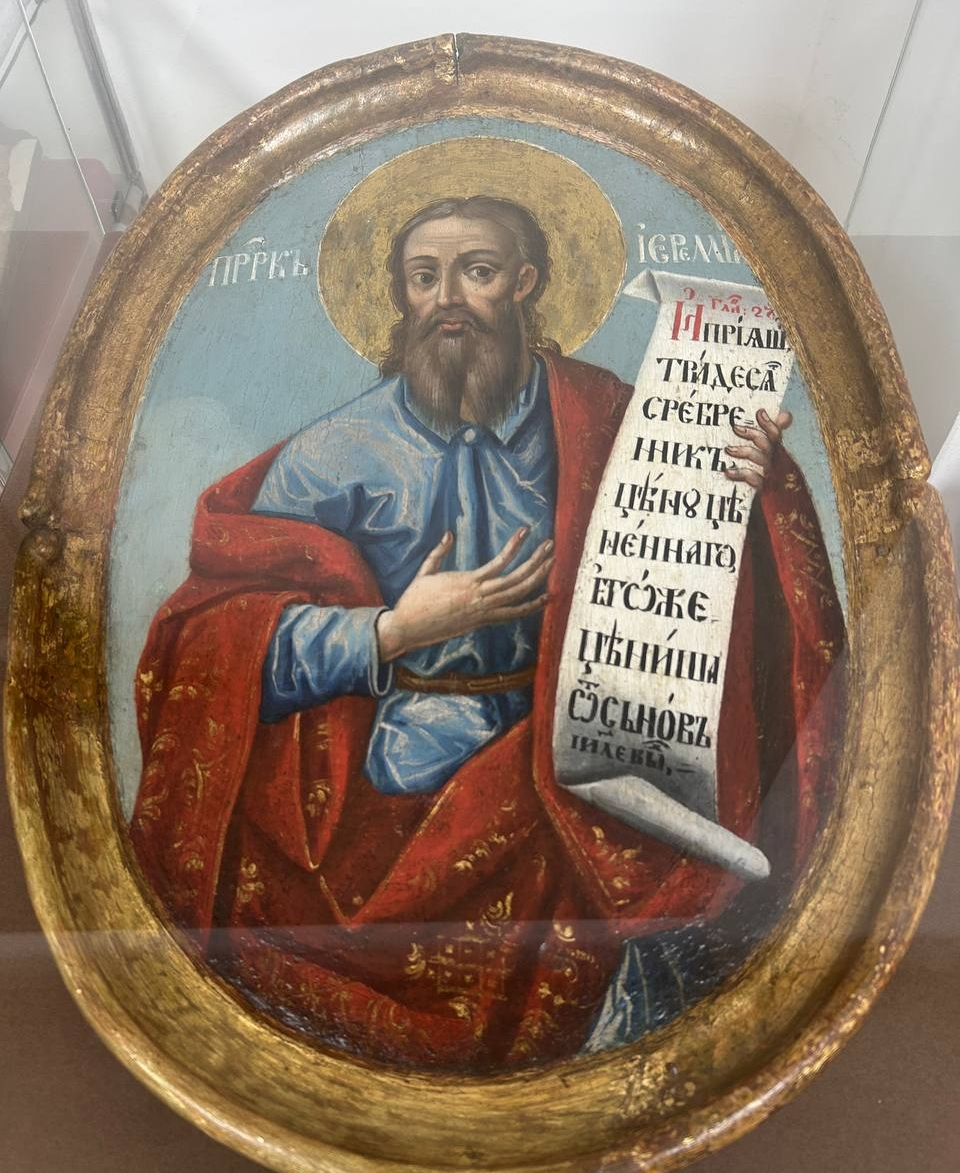
Vasilije Ostojić — Prophet Jeremiah, 1736

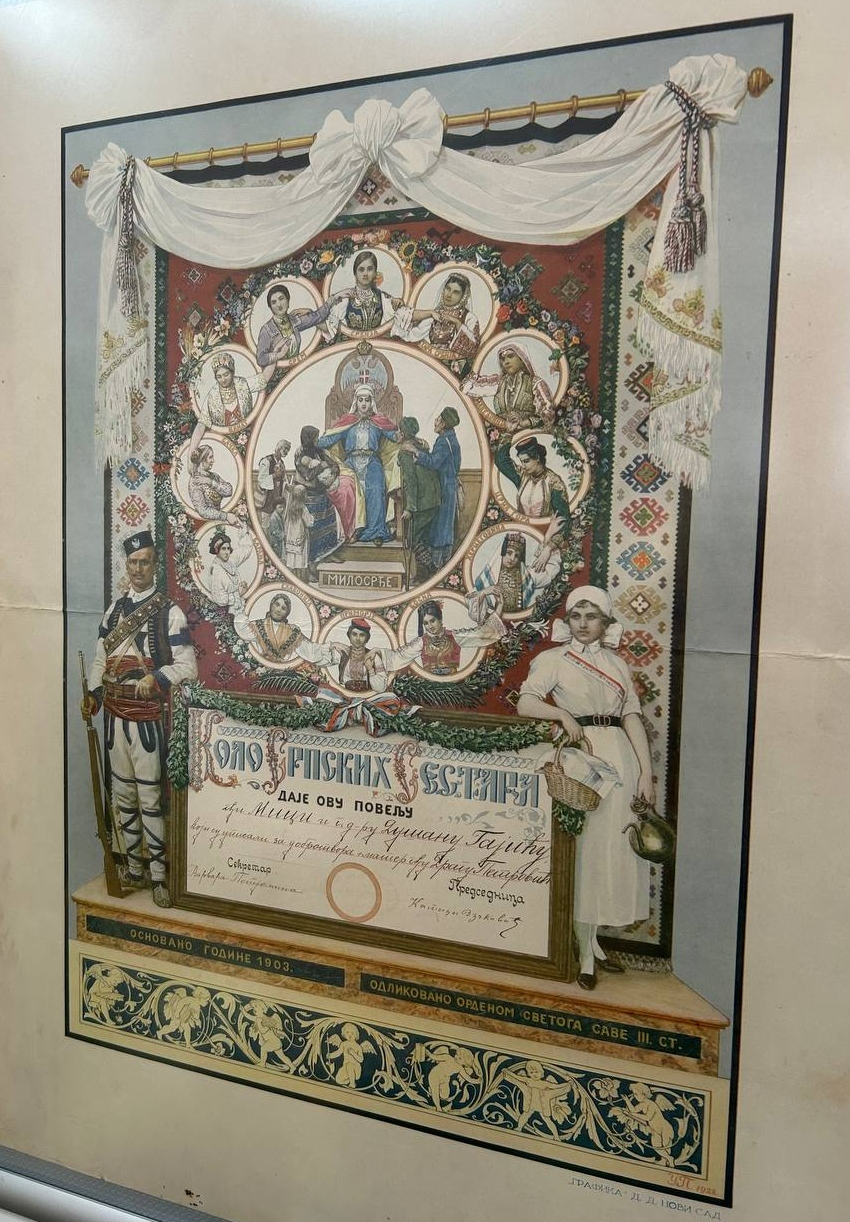
Charter of the Circle of Serbian Sisters

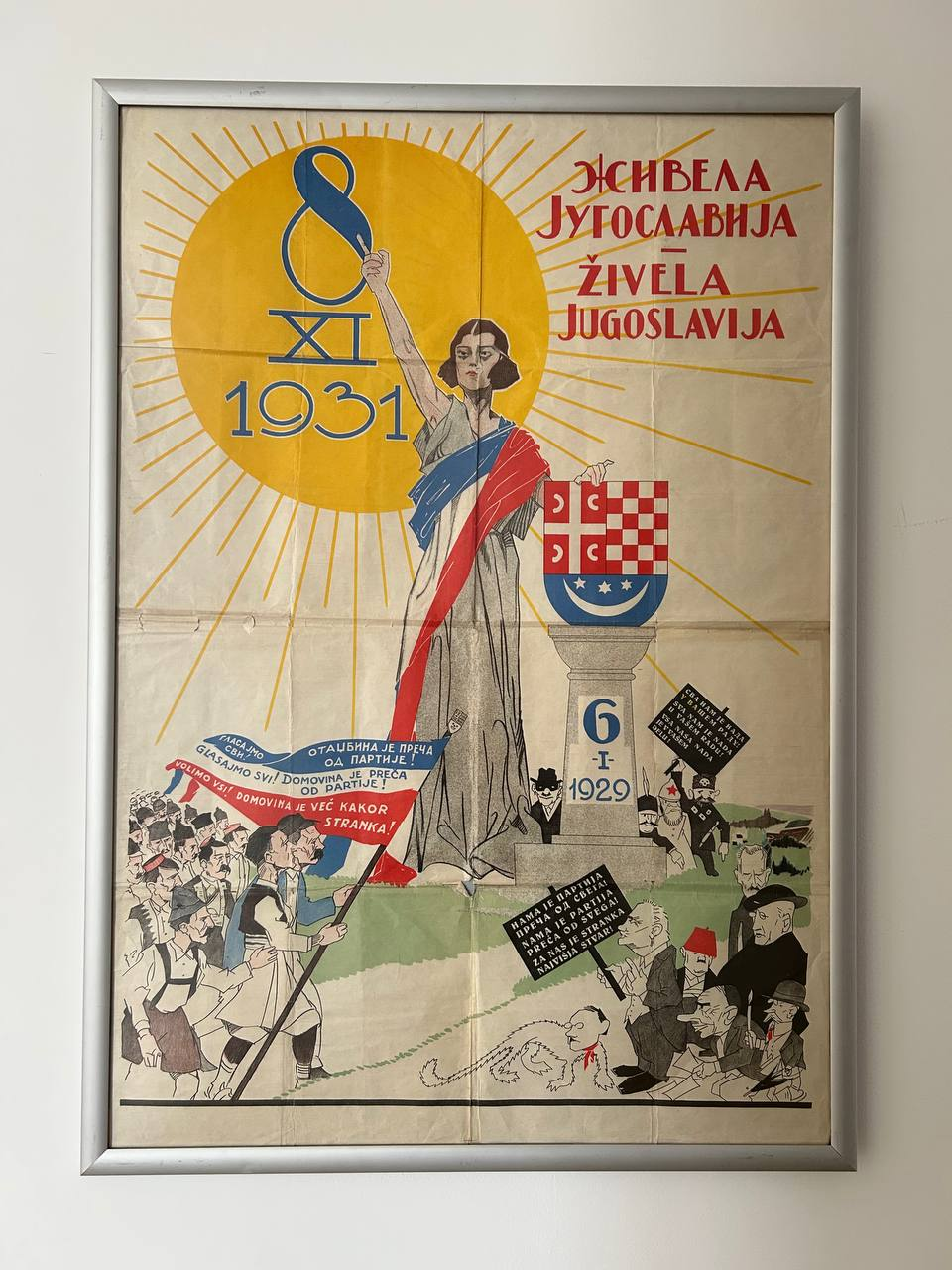
Yugoslav propaganda political poster, 1931

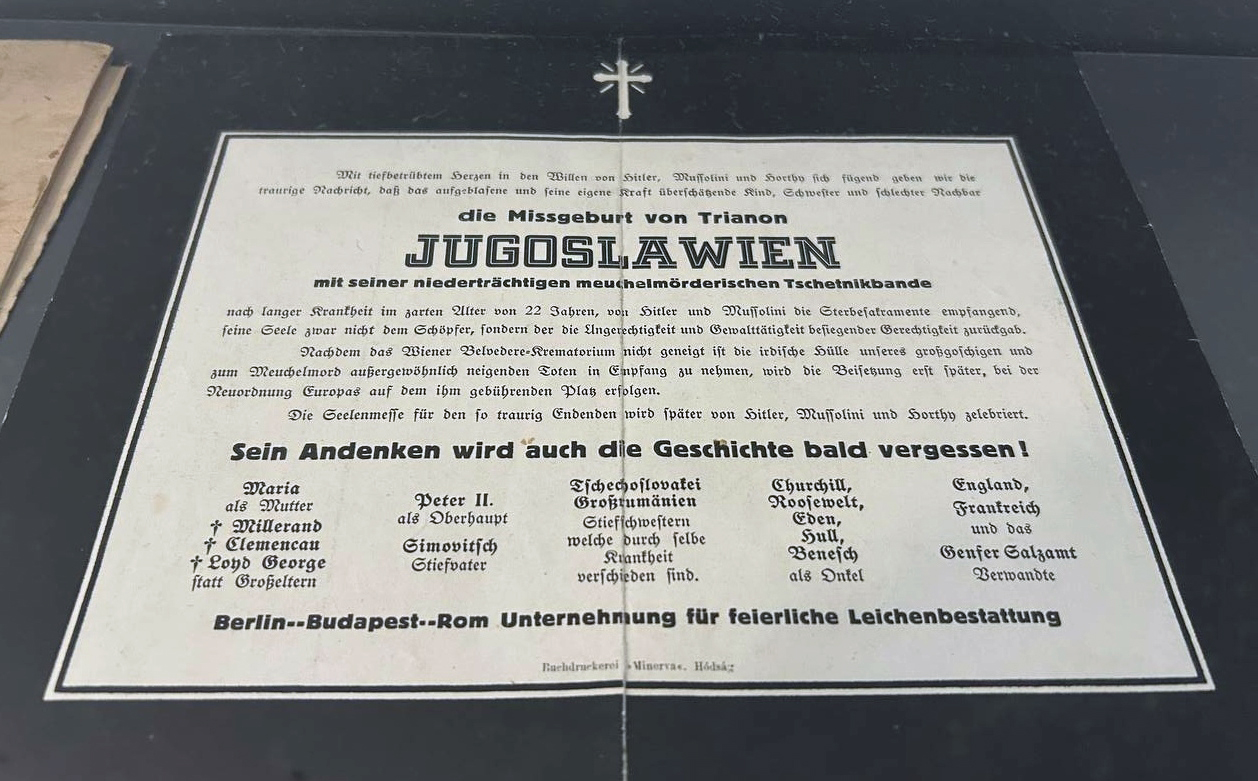
Obituary for Yugoslavia, Nazi propaganda

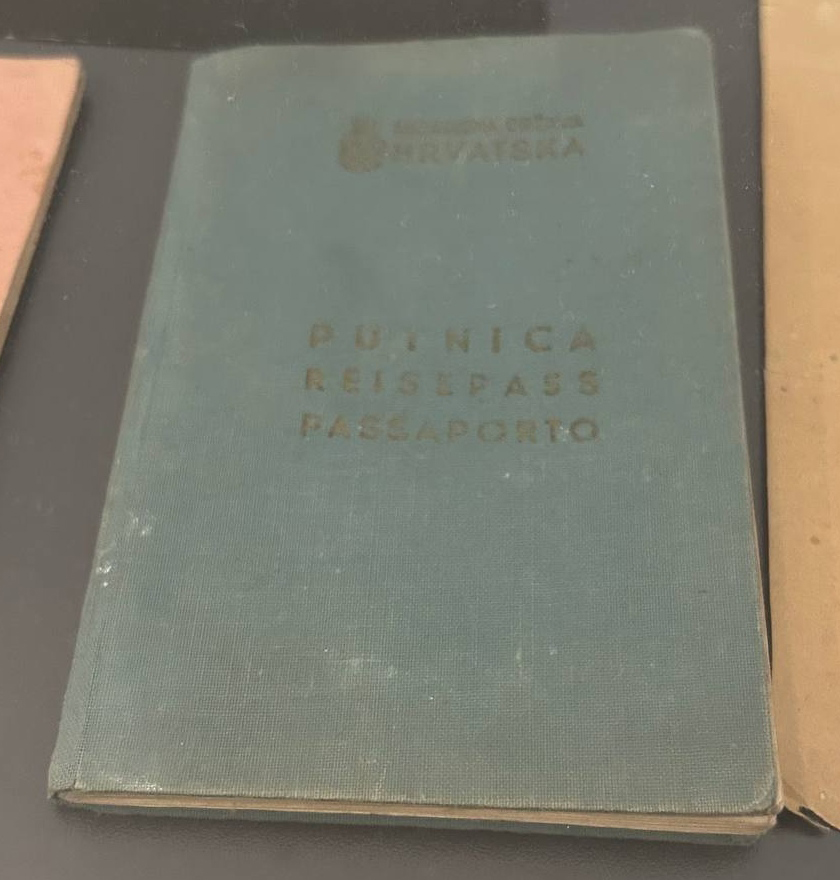
Travel document of the Independent State of Croatia (NDH)

== See also ==
- List of museums in Serbia
- Historical Archive of Srem
