= List of museums in Serbia =

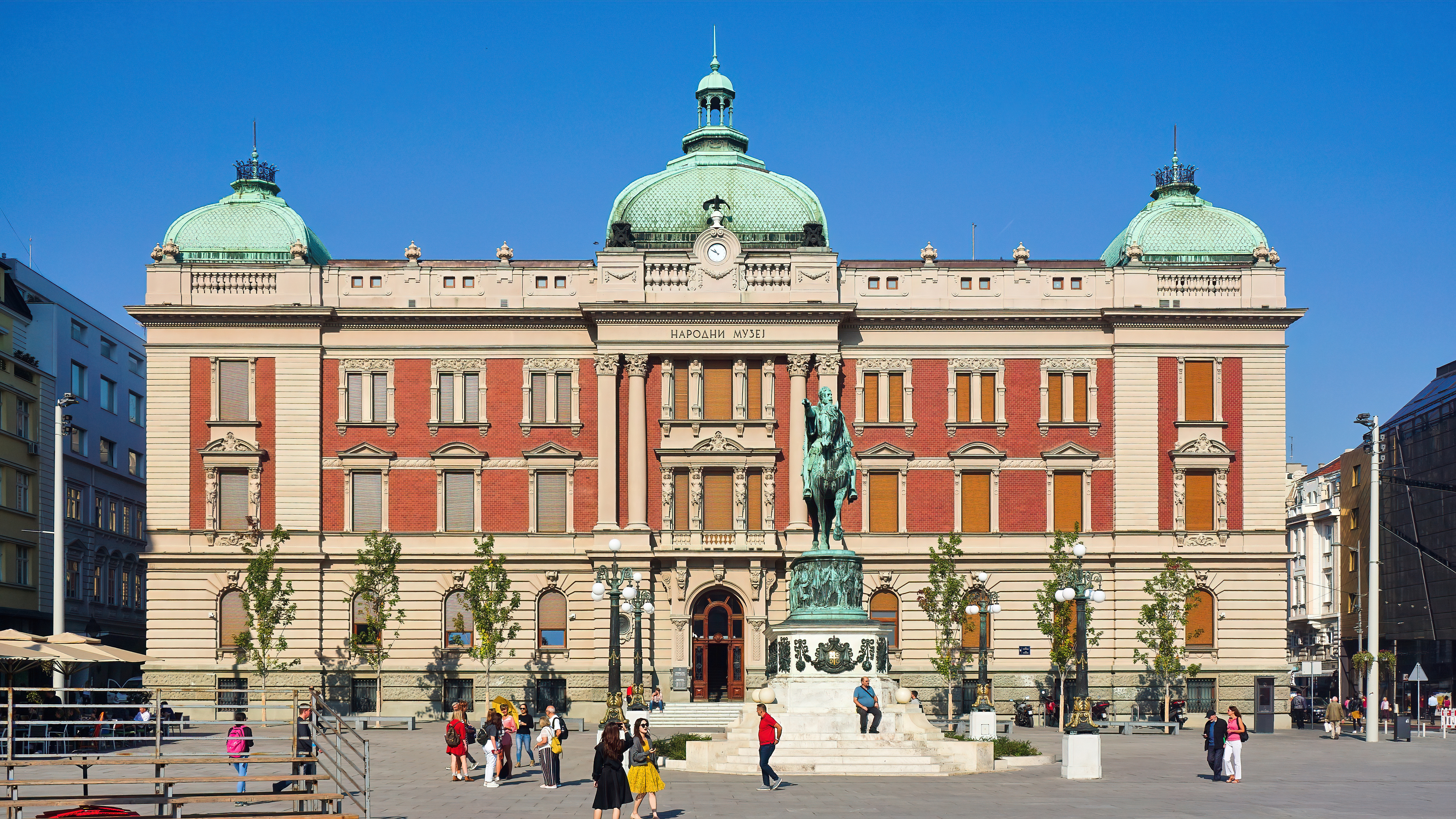
National Museum of Serbia, Belgrade

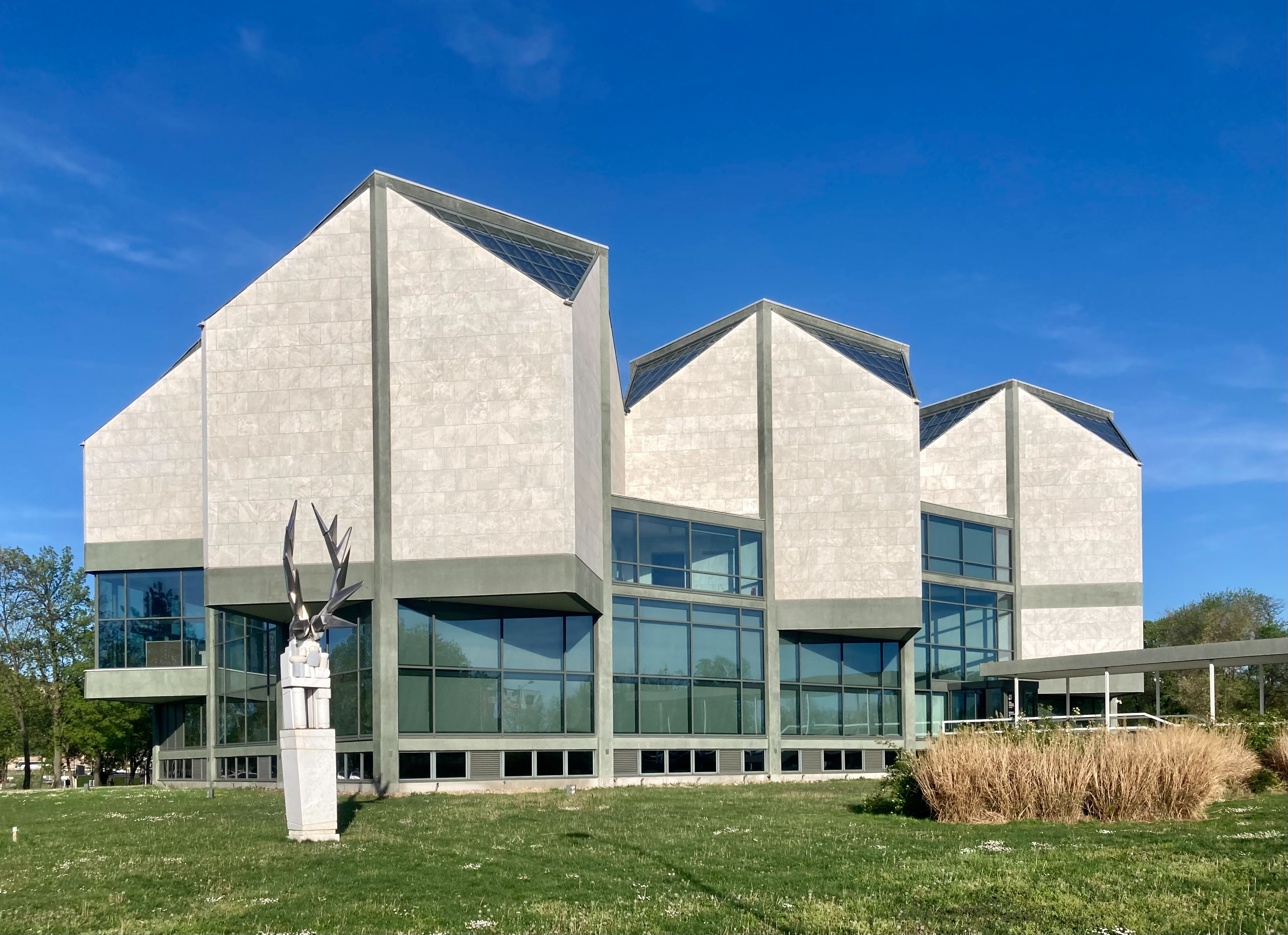
Museum of Contemporary Art, Belgrade

This is a list of museums in Serbia. The first museums in Serbia were established in the late 19th century, and by 1918, their total number had reached 32.

== List ==
=== Belgrade ===
Belgrade, the capital of Serbia, has the highest number of museums in the country - 52 institutions.

- Aeronautical Museum Belgrade
- Belgrade City Museum
- Ethnographic Museum, Belgrade
- Historical Museum of Serbia
- House of Jevrem Grujic, (Svetogorska 17)
- Jewish Historical Museum, Belgrade
- Manak's House
- Memorial Museum of Nadežda and Rastko Petrović
- Military Museum, Belgrade
- Museum of 4 July
- Museum of African Art, Belgrade
- Museum of Applied Arts, Belgrade
- Museum of Contemporary Art, Belgrade
- Museum of Ivo Andrić
- Museum of Natural History, Belgrade
- Museum of Paja Jovanović
- Museum of Roma Culture of Belgrade
- Museum of Theatrical Arts of Serbia
- Museum of Vuk and Dositej
- Museum of Yugoslavia
- National Museum of Serbia
- Nikola Tesla Museum
- Railway Museum, Belgrade
- Residence of Prince Miloš
- Spirta House, Belgrade
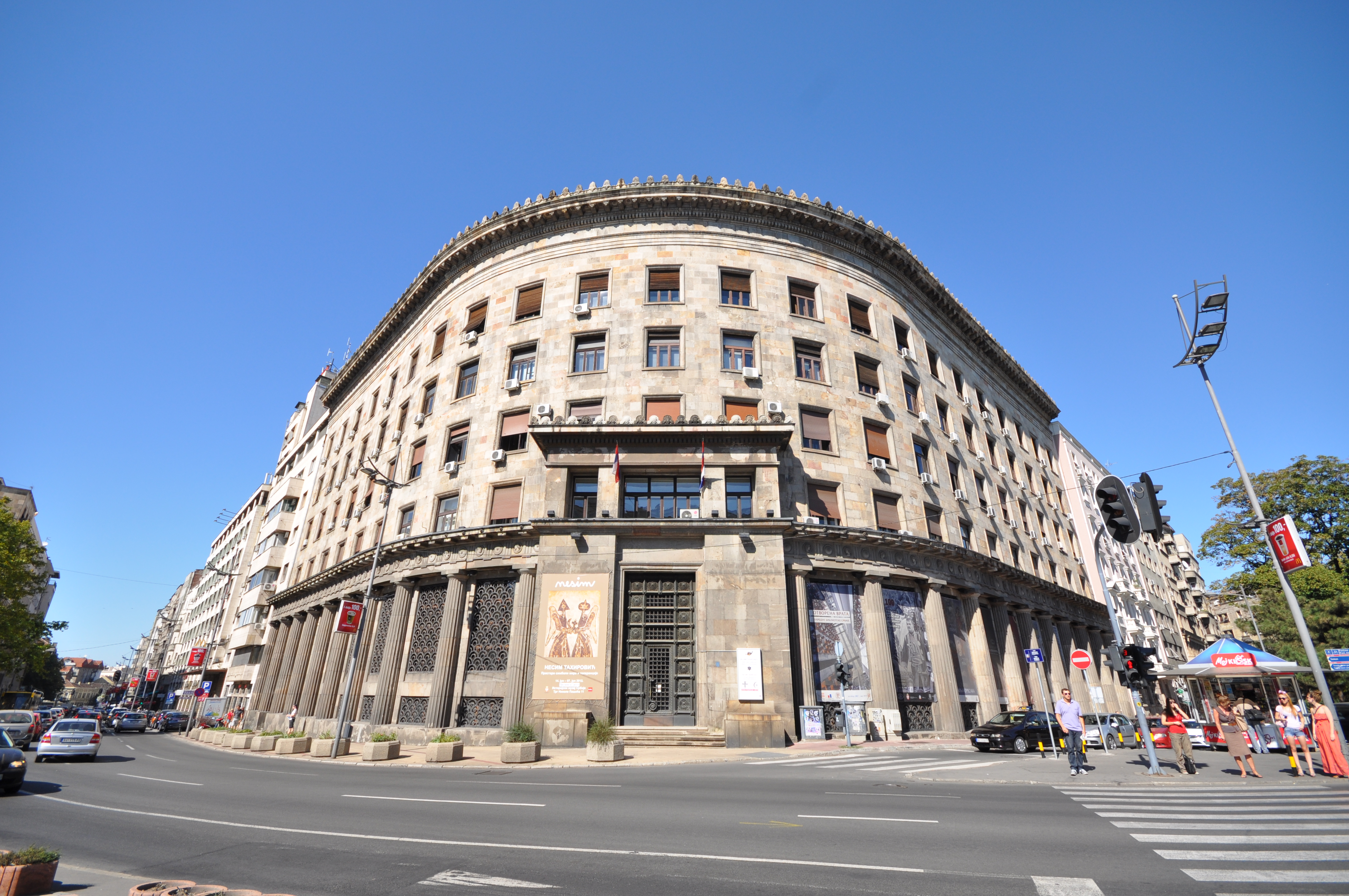
Historical Museum of Serbia

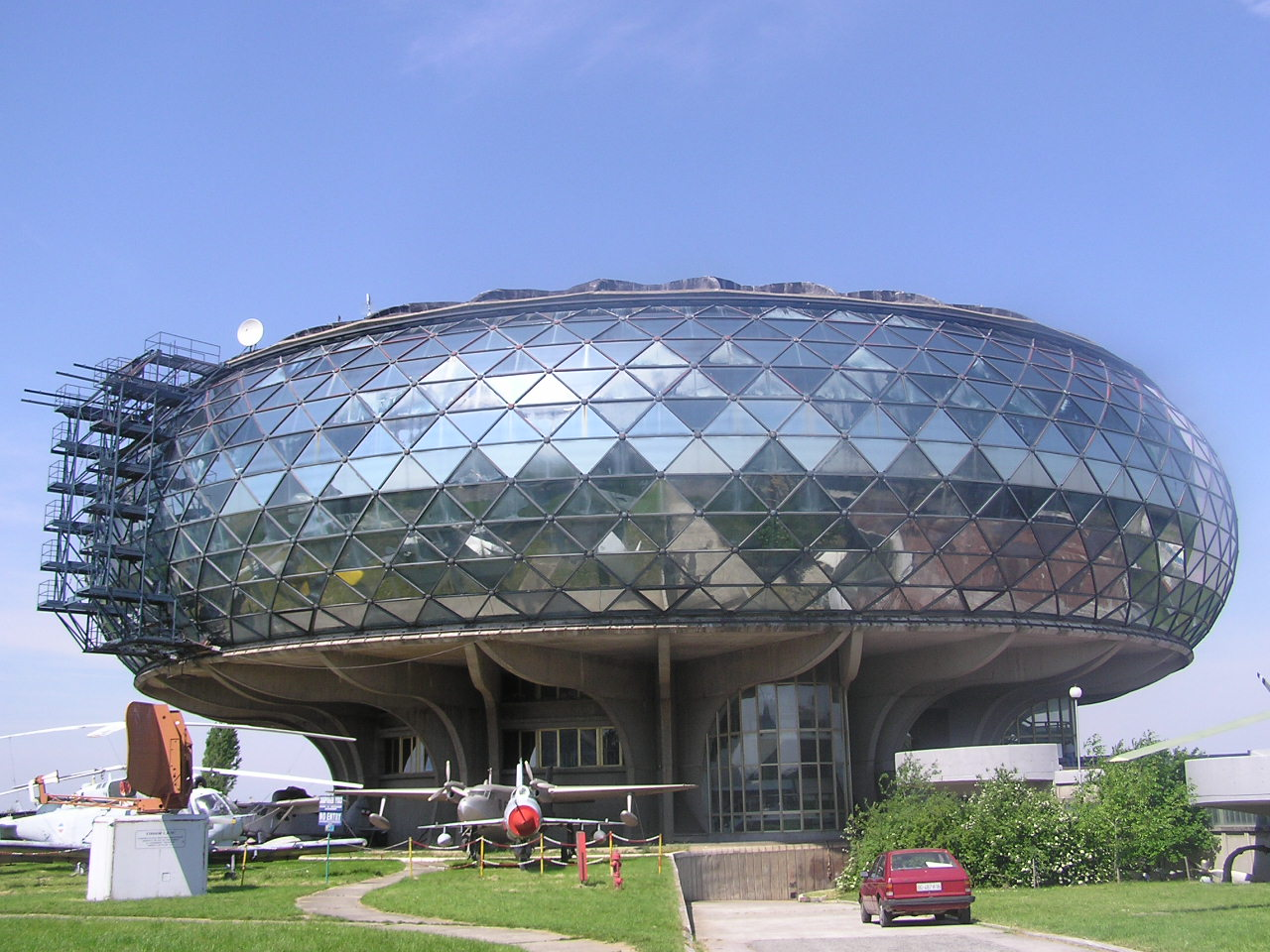
Aeronautical Museum Belgrade

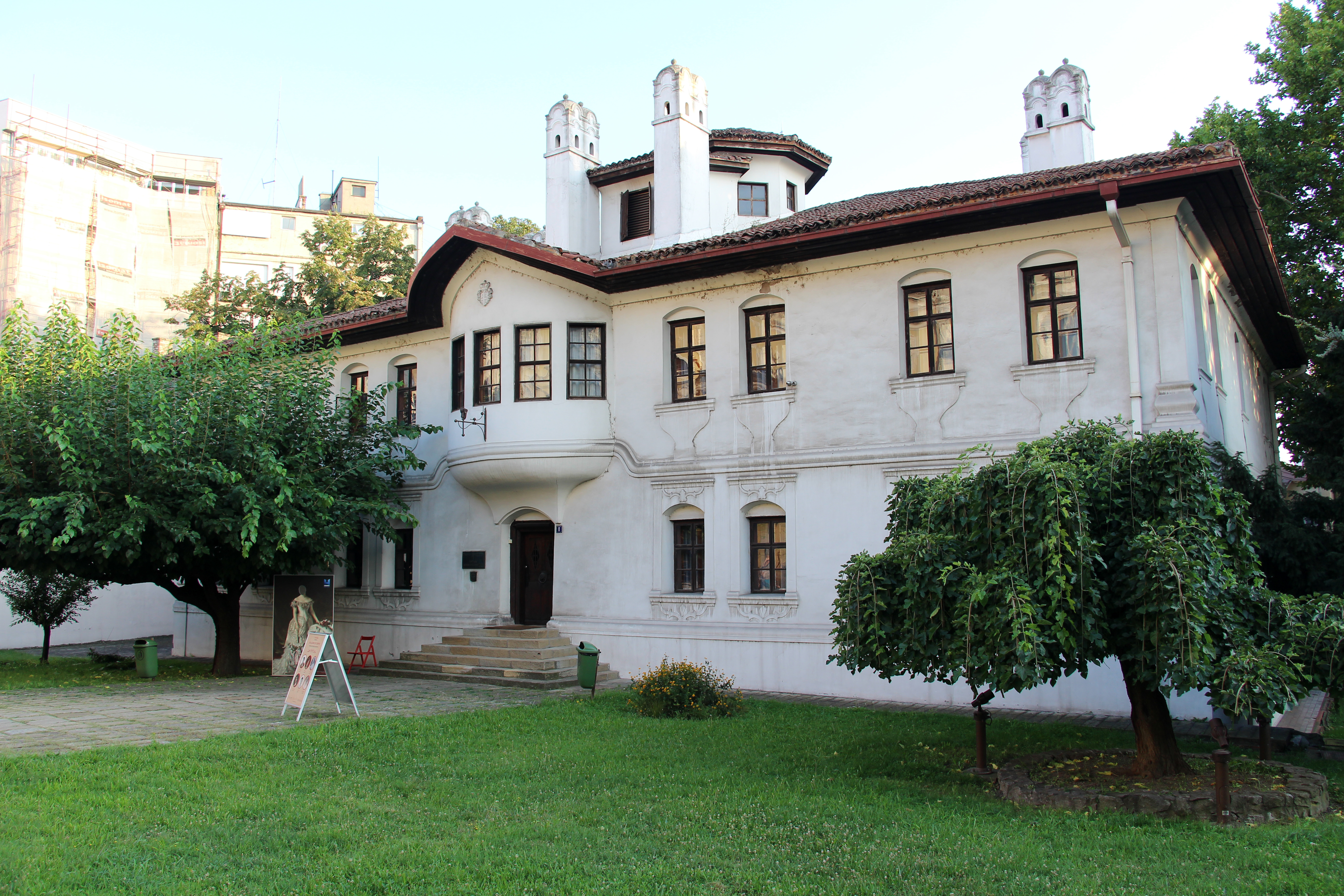
Residence of Princess Ljubica, Belgrade City Museum

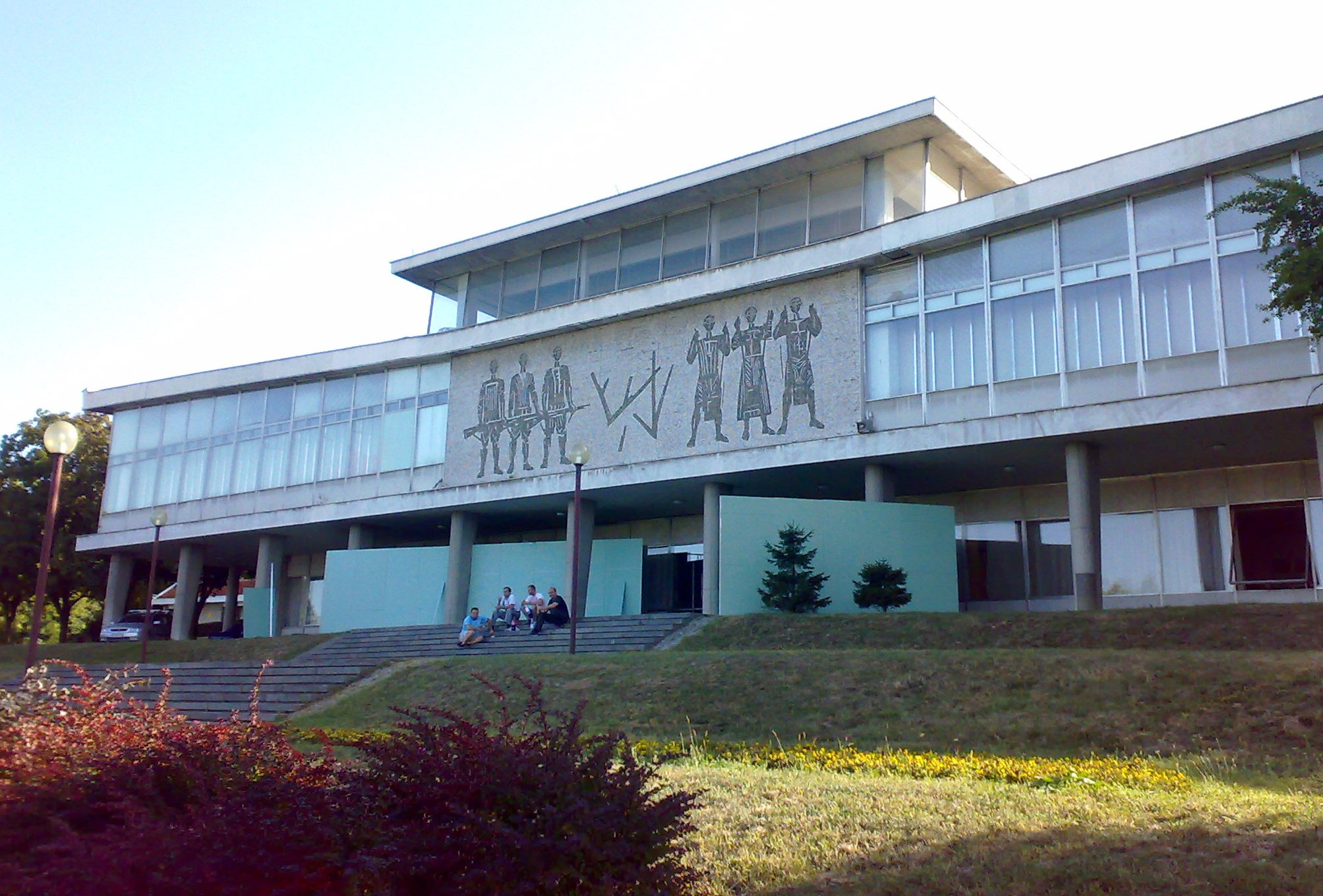
Museum of Yugoslavia

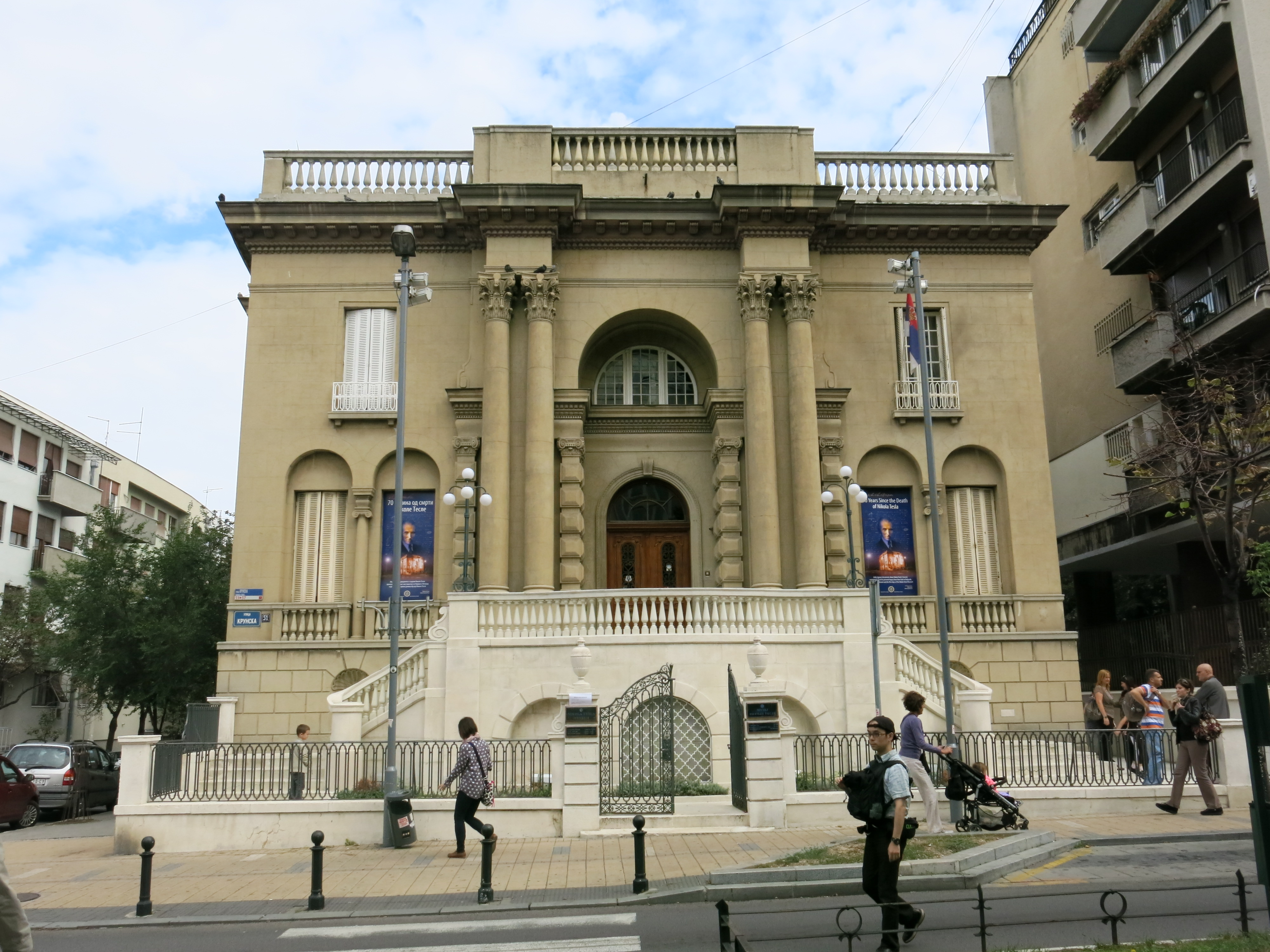
Nikola Tesla Museum

=== Vojvodina ===
- The Gallery of Fine Arts – Gift Collection of Rajko Mamuzić
- Gallery of Matica Srpska (1847–present)
- Memorial Complex in Idvor (Mihajlo Pupin) (1979–present)
- City Museum of Novi Sad (1954–present)
- Municipal Museum of Subotica (1948–present)
- Museum of Contemporary Art of Vojvodina (1966–present)
- Museum of Srem (1946–present)
- Museum of Vojvodina
- Museum of Vojvodina Slovaks (1949, 2012–present)
- Pavle Beljanski Memorial Collection
- Sombor City Museum
- National Museum of Zrenjanin (1911–present)
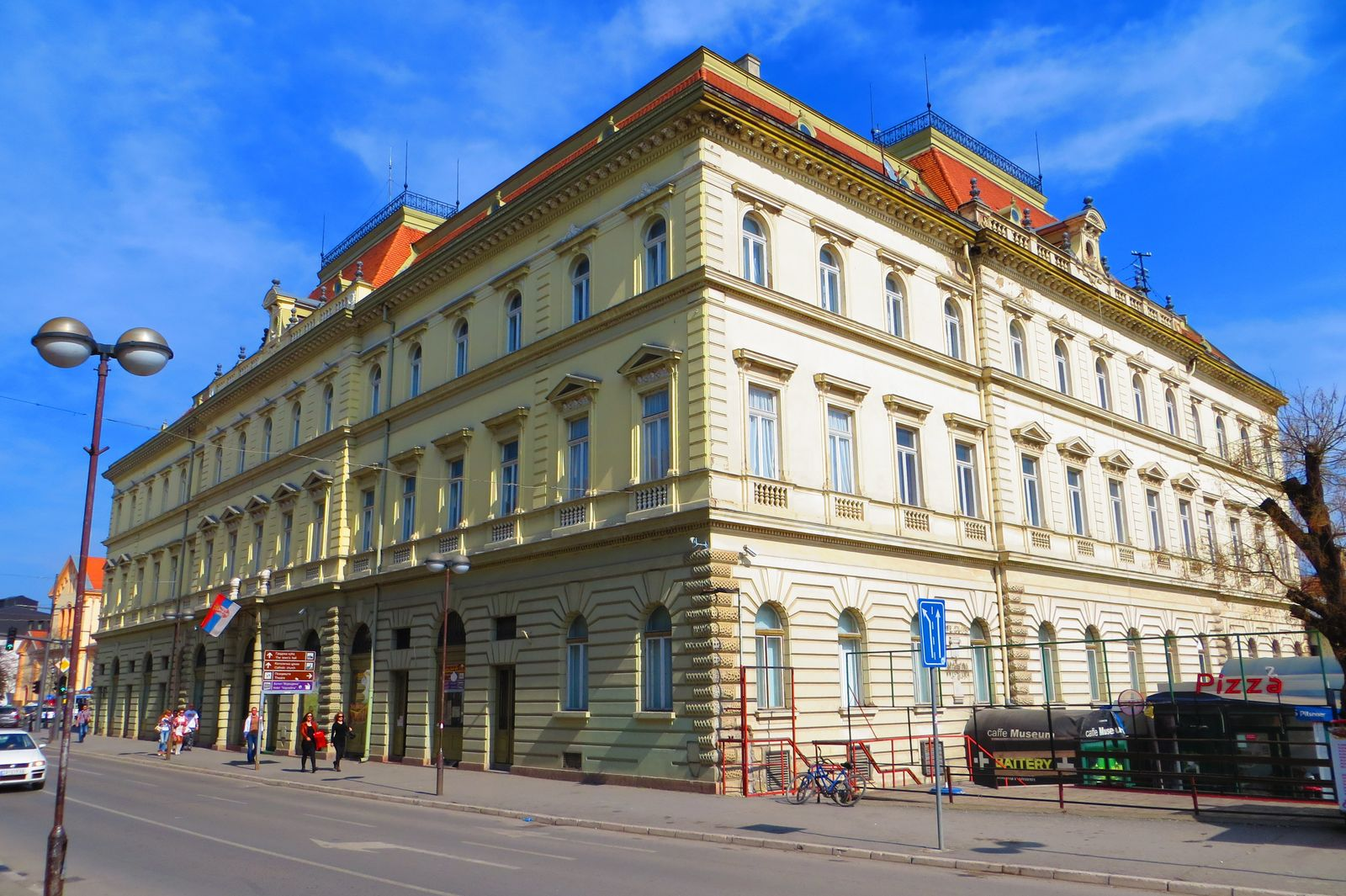
National Museum of Zrenjanin

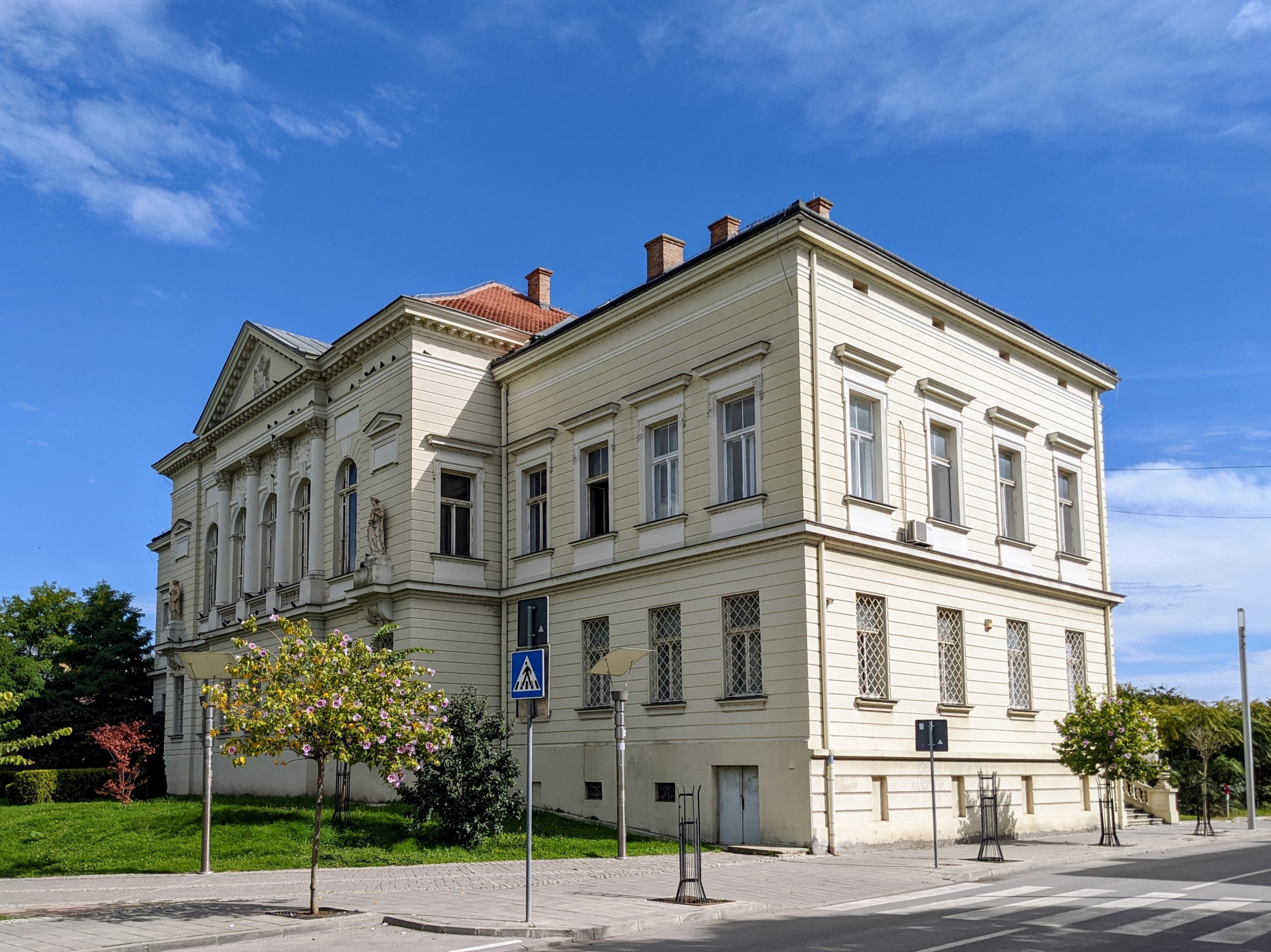
Museum of Srem

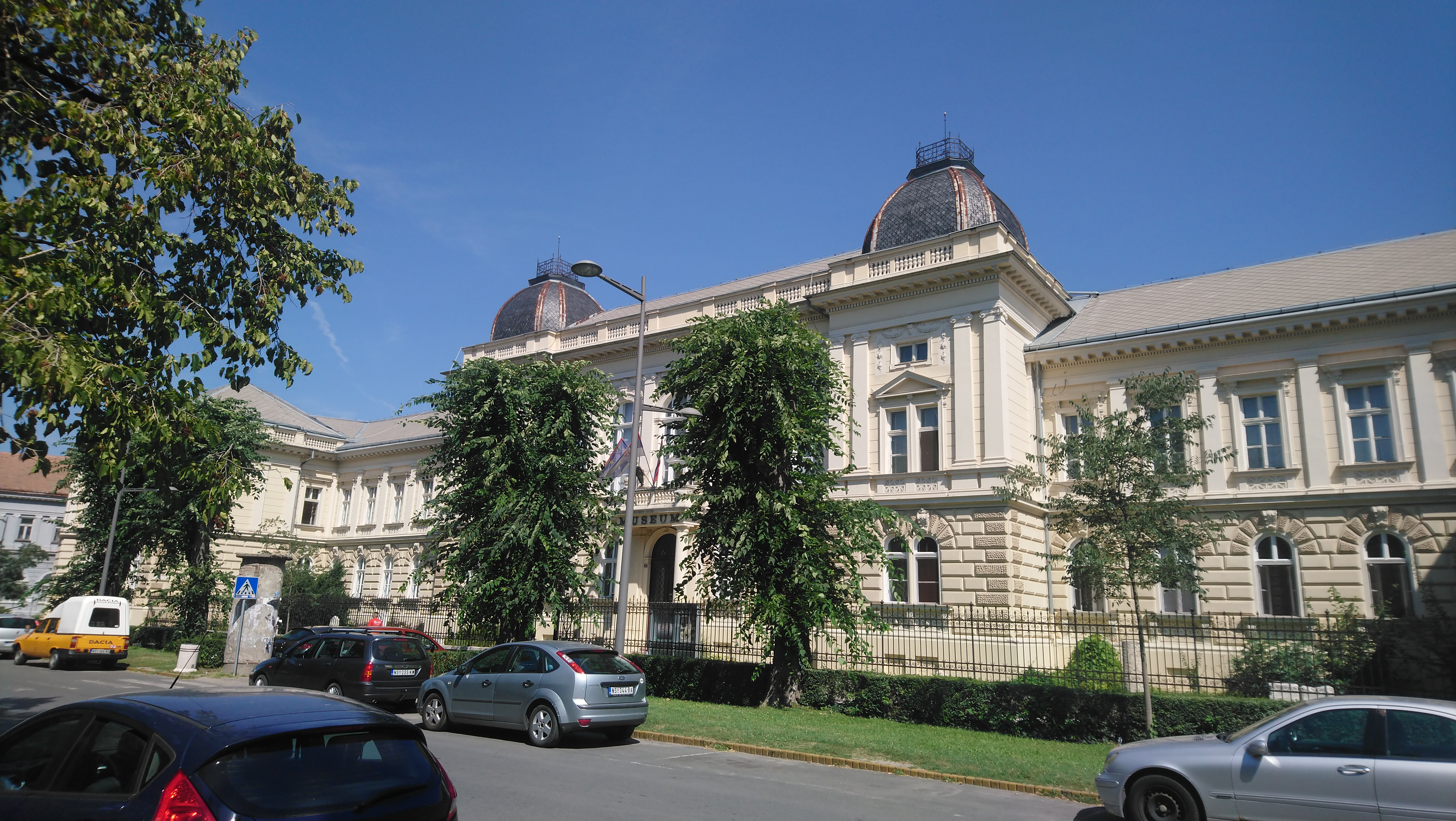
Museum of Vojvodina

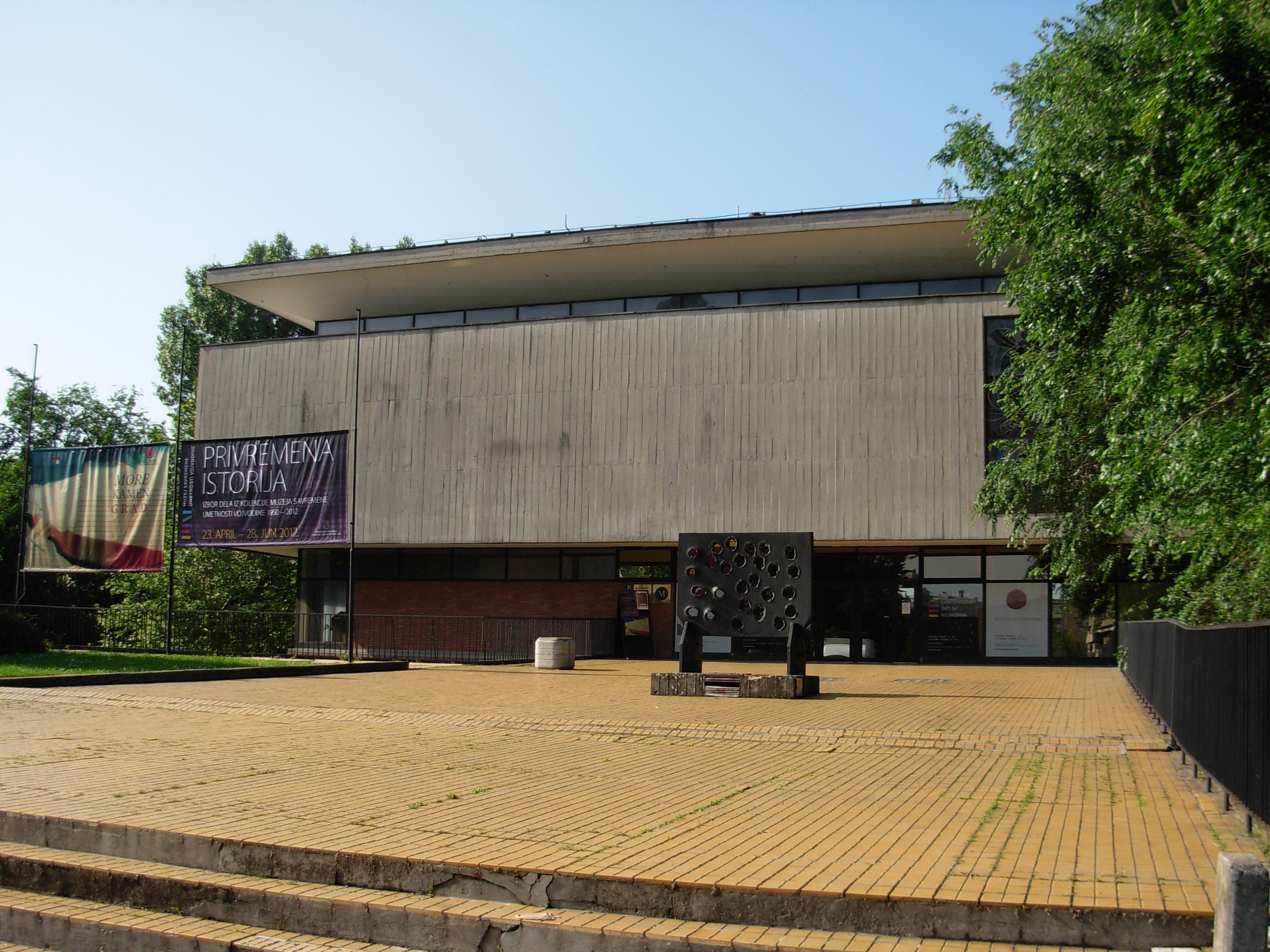
Museum of Contemporary Art of Vojvodina

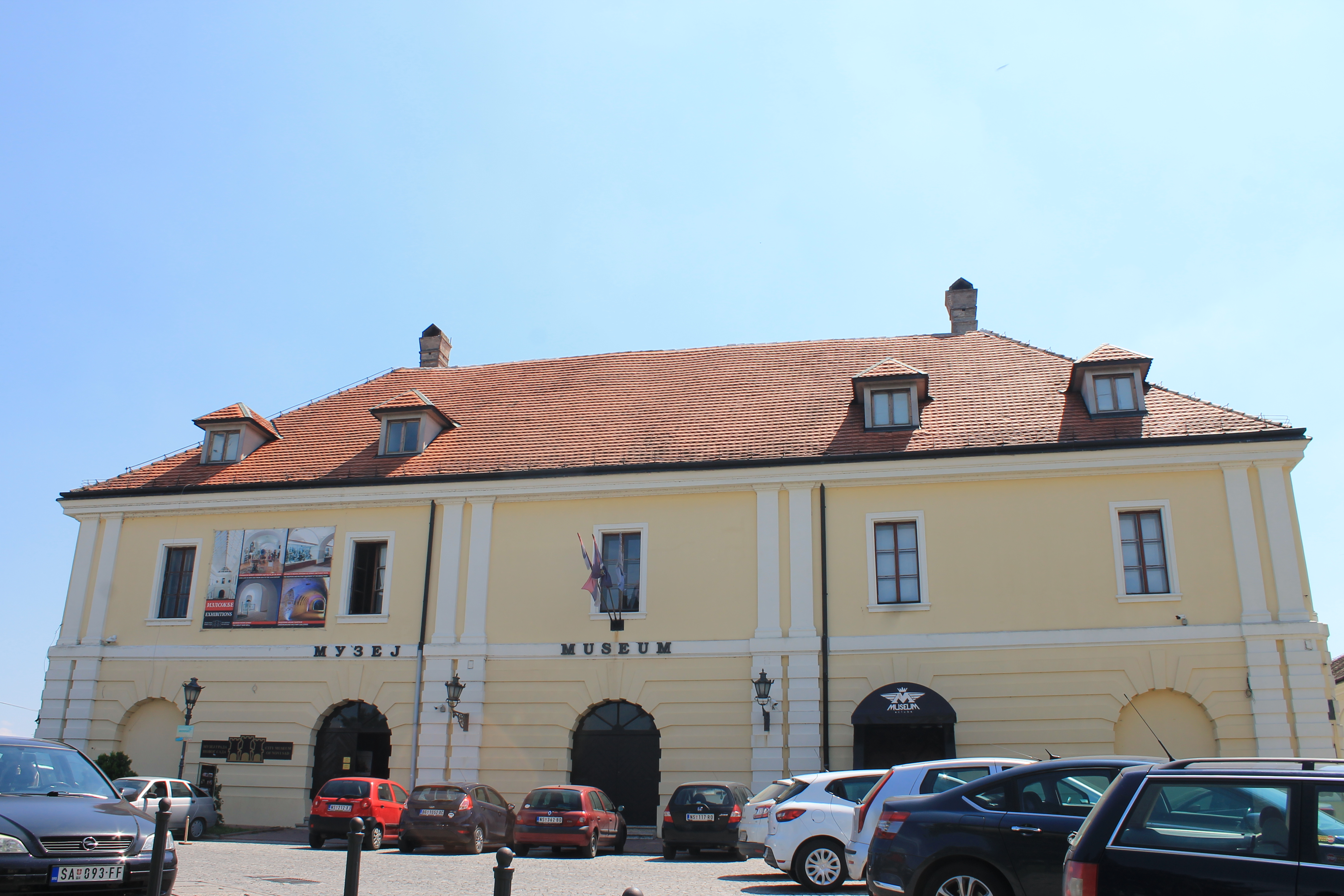
City Museum of Novi Sad

=== Central Serbia ===
- Jadar Museum
- National Museum of Čačak (1952–present)
- National Museum of Kraljevo (1950–present)
- National Museum of Šumadija, Kragujevac (1949–present)
- Old House, Pirot
- Šumarice Memorial Park
- Takovo Museum
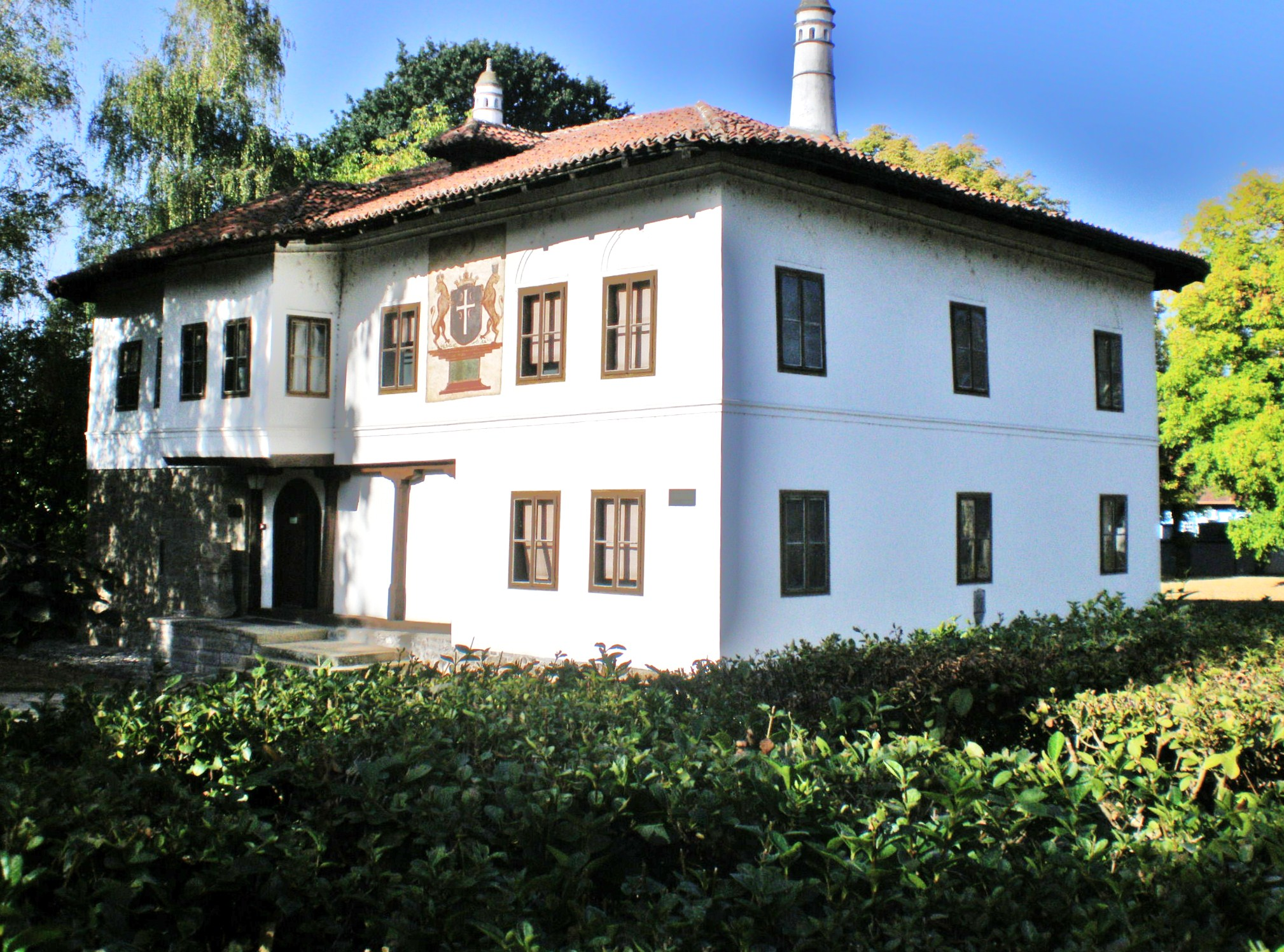
National Museum of Čačak

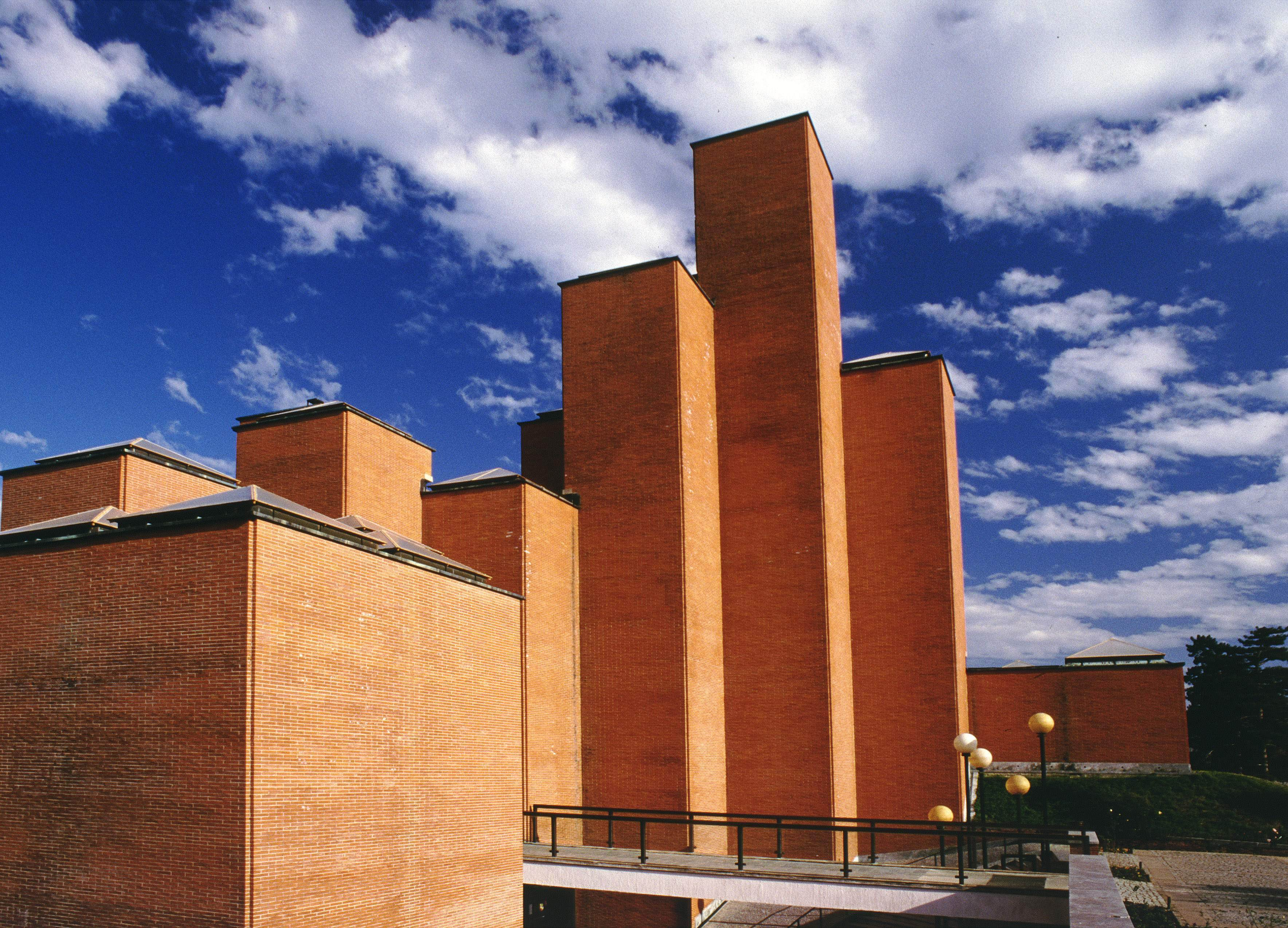
Memorial Museum "21 October"

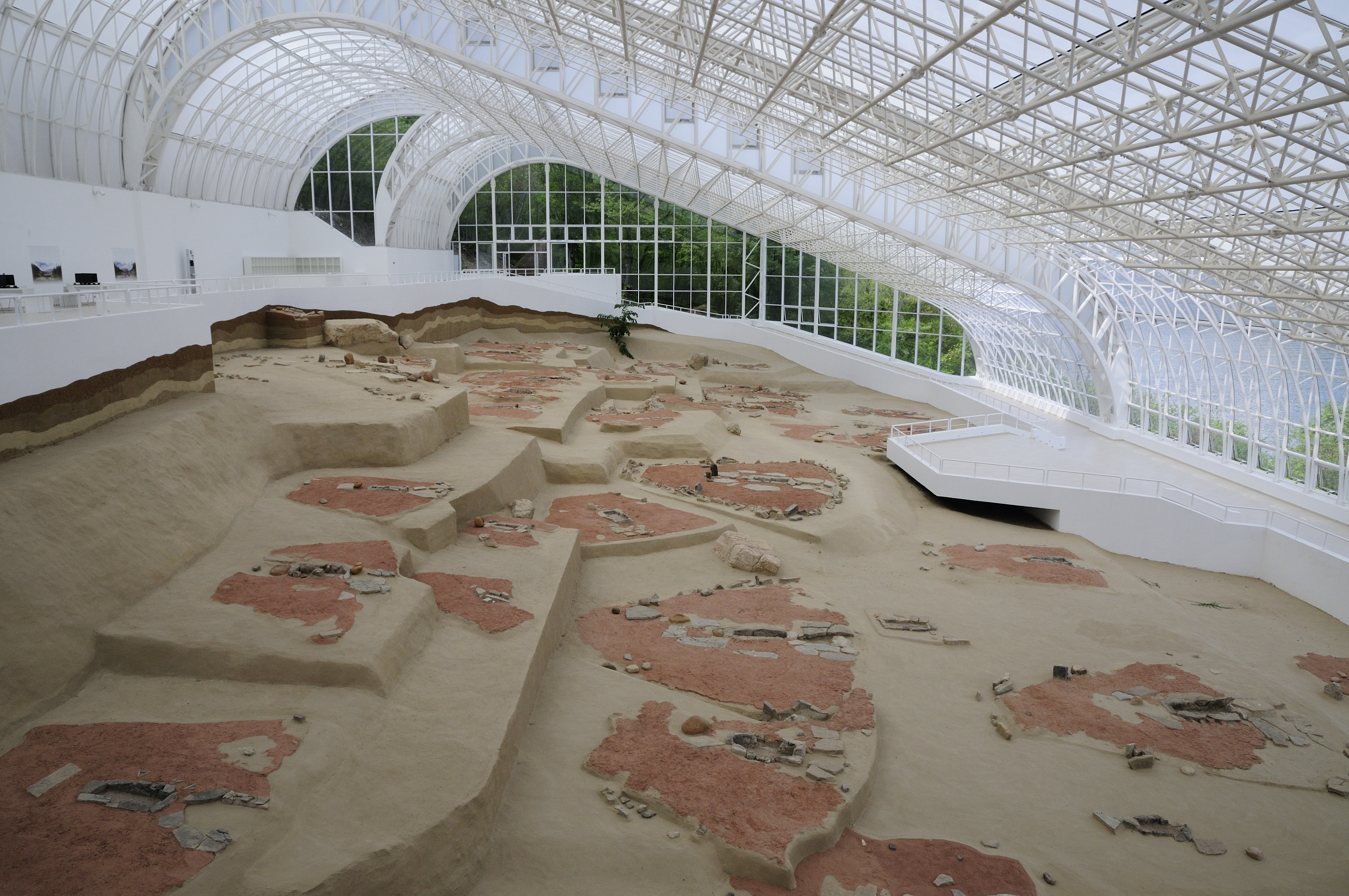
Lepenski Vir

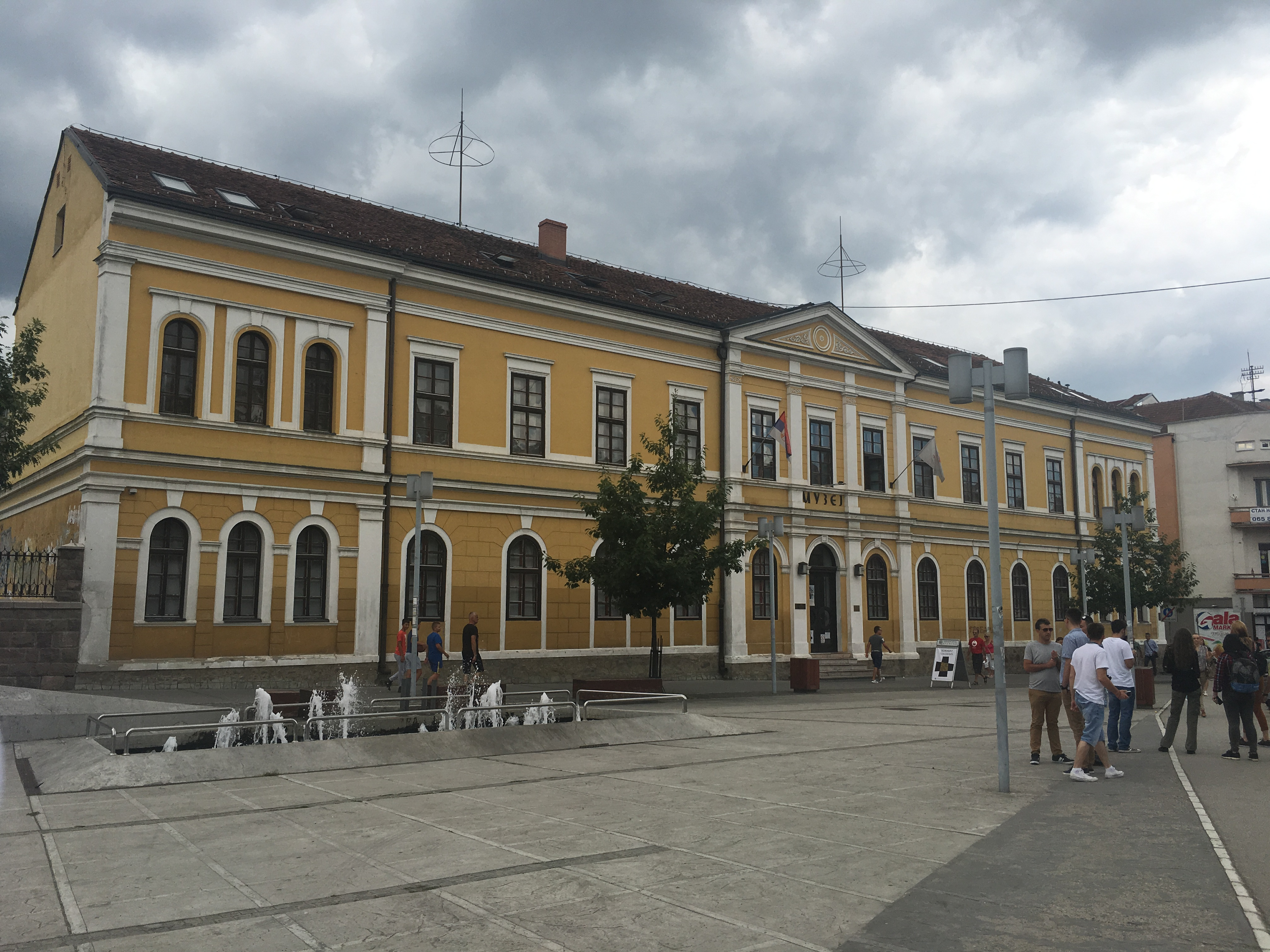
National Museum of Kraljevo

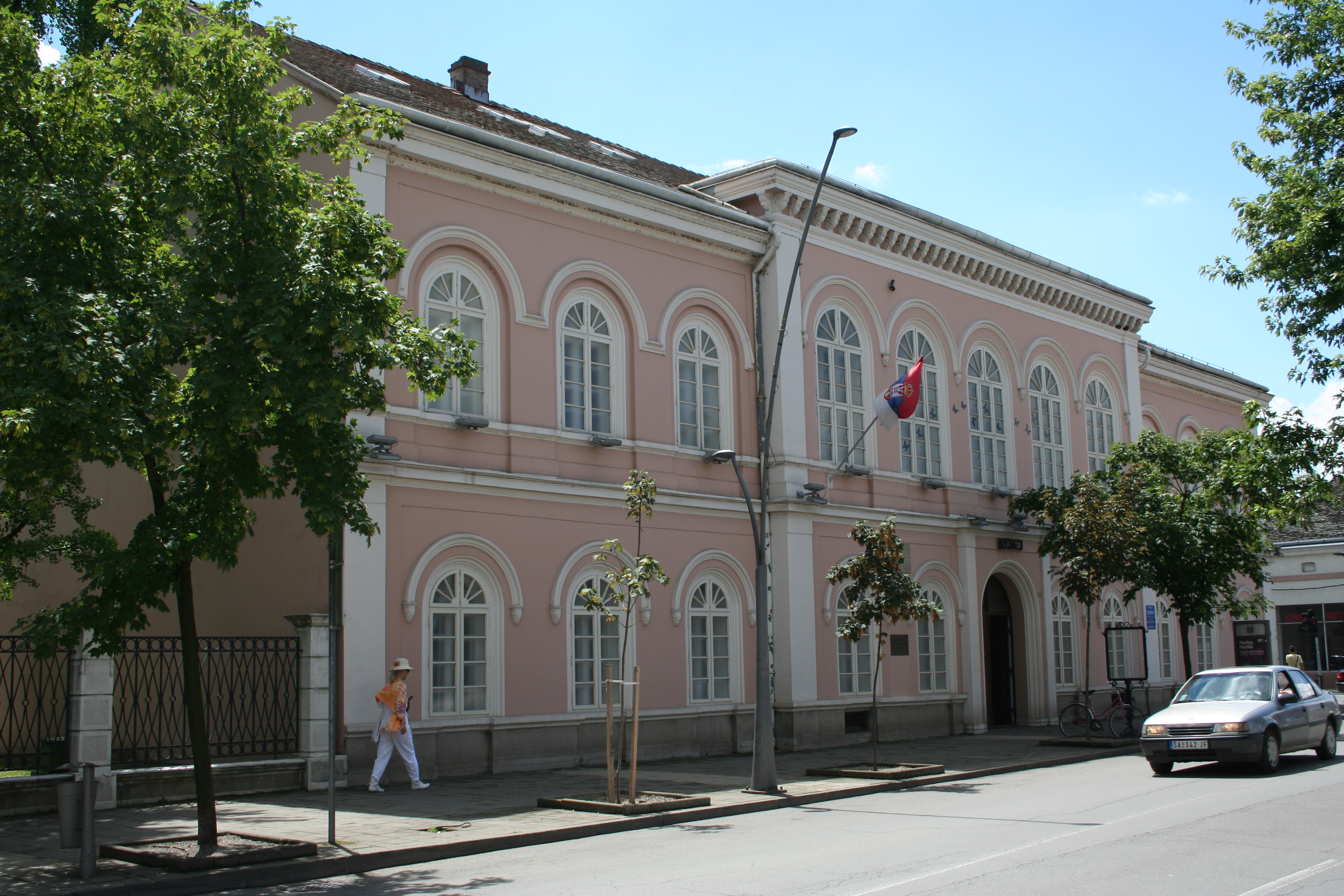
National Museum of Šabac

== See also ==
- List of museums
- Tourism in Serbia
- Culture of Serbia
- List of archives in Serbia
