= Municipal Museum of Subotica =

- Градски музеј Суботица; Gradski muzej Subotica; Szabadkai Városi Múzeum

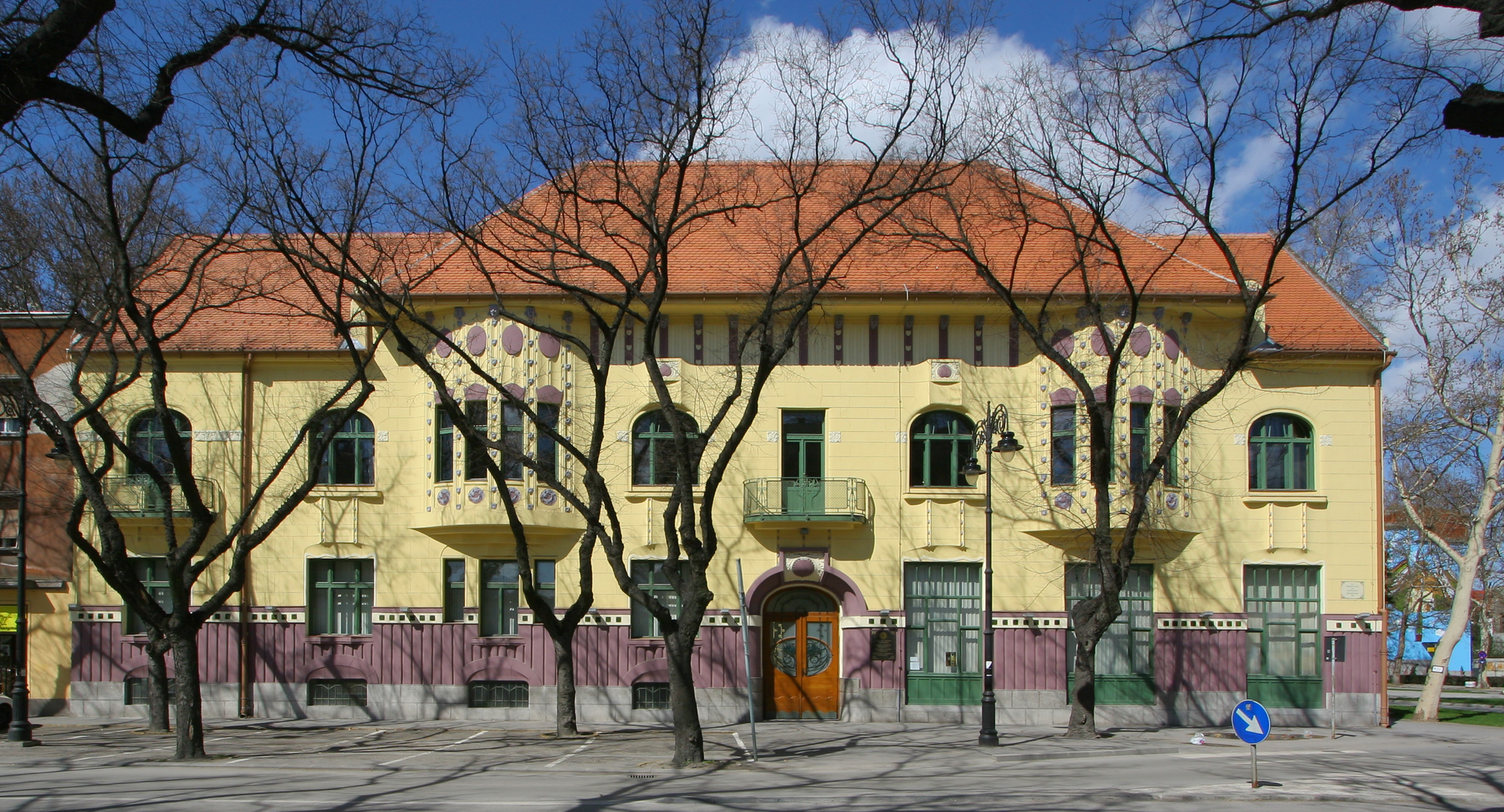
- The main building of the museum
- Established: 1892; 134 years ago
- Location: Subotica, Vojvodina, Serbia
- Coordinates: 46°06′08″N 19°39′41″E
- Type: History museum Art museum
- Website: gradskimuzej.subotica.rs

The Municipal Museum of Subotica (Serbian: Градски музеј Суботица, Gradski muzej Subotica, Hungarian: Szabadkai Városi Múzeum) in Subotica, Vojvodina, Serbia, is the municipal institution focused on the research, preservation and presentation of historical objects and artifacts related to the north Bačka region. The museum was originally founded in 1892 and was re-established in the aftermath of World War II in Yugoslavia in 1948 by the Subotica Municipal Assembly. The palace housing the City Museum was built by Dr. Mikša Demeter according to a design by the Vago brothers from Budapest. The building was designed and constructed in 1906.

== Collection ==
The art collection houses an important selection of works by artists associated with Subotica. It features a distinguished gallery of Hungarian artists from Vojvodina (1830–1930), alongside works by prominent South Slavic artists such as Nikola Aleksić, Stjepan Baković, Milan Konjović, Novak Radonić and Sava Šumanović. The archaeological collection includes artifacts from the Neolithic to the Middle Ages. The natural history collection features geological, paleontological, mineralogical, petrological, zoological, and botanical specimens.

== See also ==
- List of museums in Serbia
- Historical Archive of Subotica
