= Museum of Contemporary Art of Vojvodina =

Art museum in Dunavska, Novi Sad, Serbia

- Музеј савремене уметности Војводине (Serbian); Muzej savremene umetnosti Vojvodine (Serbian); Vajdasági Kortárs Művészeti Múzeum (Hungarian); Múzeum súčasného umenia Vojvodiny (Slovak); Музей сучасного мистецтва Войводини (Pannonian Rusyn)

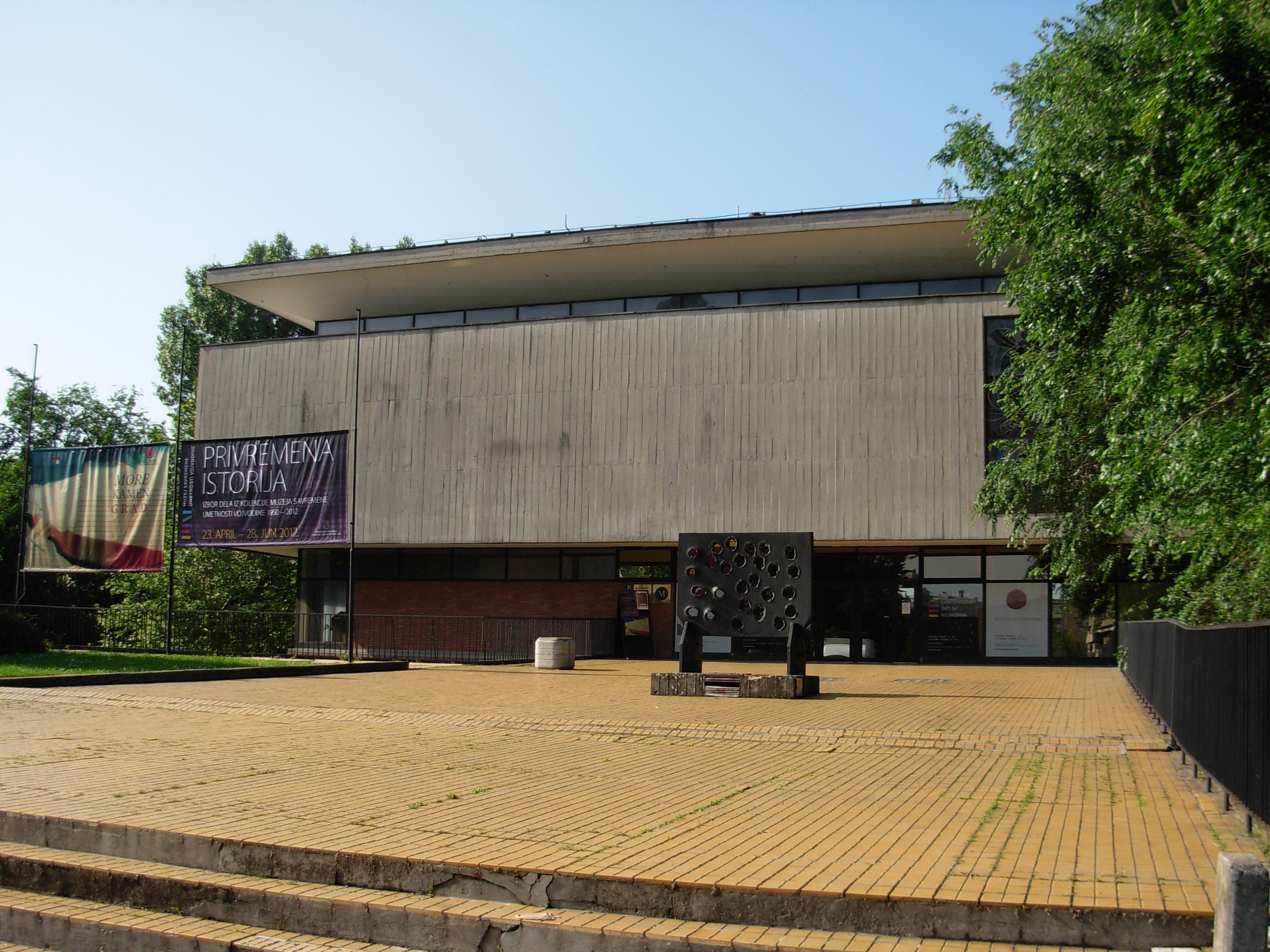
- The main building of the museum in 2012
- Former name: Gallery of Contemporary Fine Arts of Novi Sad (1966–1996); Creating Museum of Contemporary Art, Novi Sad (1996–2004)
- Established: 1966; 60 years ago
- Location: Dunavska 37, Novi Sad
- Coordinates: 45.2566°N 19.8532°E
- Type: Art museum
- Collection size: 2500 artworks (as of 2011)
- Founder: Assembly of Vojvodina
- Website: msuv.org/en/

The Museum of Contemporary Art of Vojvodina, (Note: Serbian: Музеј савремене уметности Војводине, romanized: Muzej savremene umetnosti Vojvodine, Hungarian: Vajdasági Kortárs Művészeti Múzeum, Slovak: Múzeum súčasného umenia Vojvodiny Rusyn: Музей сучасного мистецтва Войводини) is an art museum located in Novi Sad, Vojvodina, Serbia. It is dedicated to the preservation, study, and presentation of contemporary art from the second half of the 20th century and the 21st century, with a particular focus on the region of Vojvodina. The museum also plays a significant role in connecting the local art scene with international artistic movements.

Established on 1 February 1966, as the Gallery of Contemporary Art, the institution evolved in 1996 to become the Museum of Contemporary Art in Novi Sad. It adopted its current name, the Museum of Contemporary Art of Vojvodina, on 24 March 2004.

The building housing the museum, located across from Dunavski Park, was designed in 1959 by architect Ivo Vitić for the Museum of Socialist Revolution, which was later renamed the Museum of Vojvodina. Today, one of the wings of this building today houses the Museum of Contemporary Art of Vojvodina.

== History ==
The museum was originally founded as the Gallery of Contemporary Fine Arts – Novi Sad by a decision of the Assembly of the Autonomous Province of Vojvodina on 1 February 1966. The institution's name and scope of work have changed several times over the years to reflect its evolving role. In 1996, the gallery expanded its activities to include museological functions, transforming into a museum dedicated to a broader range of contemporary art practices.

Although founded in 1966, the museum was unable to commence its exhibition and publishing activities until 1969 due to the absence of a permanent space. In its early years, the museum operated out of several public venues in Novi Sad, including the Gallery of Matica Srpska, the Workers' University, the Youth Tribune, and the JNA House. In 1984, the museum secured a leased space within the "Vojvodina Sports and Business Center," where it remained until 1999. This period allowed the museum to consistently develop its core programs, leading to numerous important contributions to contemporary art in Vojvodina.

However, after November 1999, the museum once again lost its dedicated space and began hosting exhibitions in other institutions, including the Gallery of the Serbian Academy of Sciences and Arts Branch from 2000 to 2001, and from 2001 onwards, the Museum of Vojvodina in the former Museum of Socialist Revolution building.

In recent years, the Museum of Contemporary Art of Vojvodina gained international recognition by producing the Serbian Pavilion at the 54th Venice Biennale in 2011, where it showcased the works of conceptual artist Dragoljub Raša Todosijević.

== See also ==
- List of museums in Serbia
- Museum of Vojvodina
- Museum of Contemporary Art, Belgrade
- Museum of Modern Art of Republika Srpska
