= Memorial Ossuary, Čačak =

War memorial in Čačak, Serbia

Coordinates: 43°52′34″N 20°20′26″E

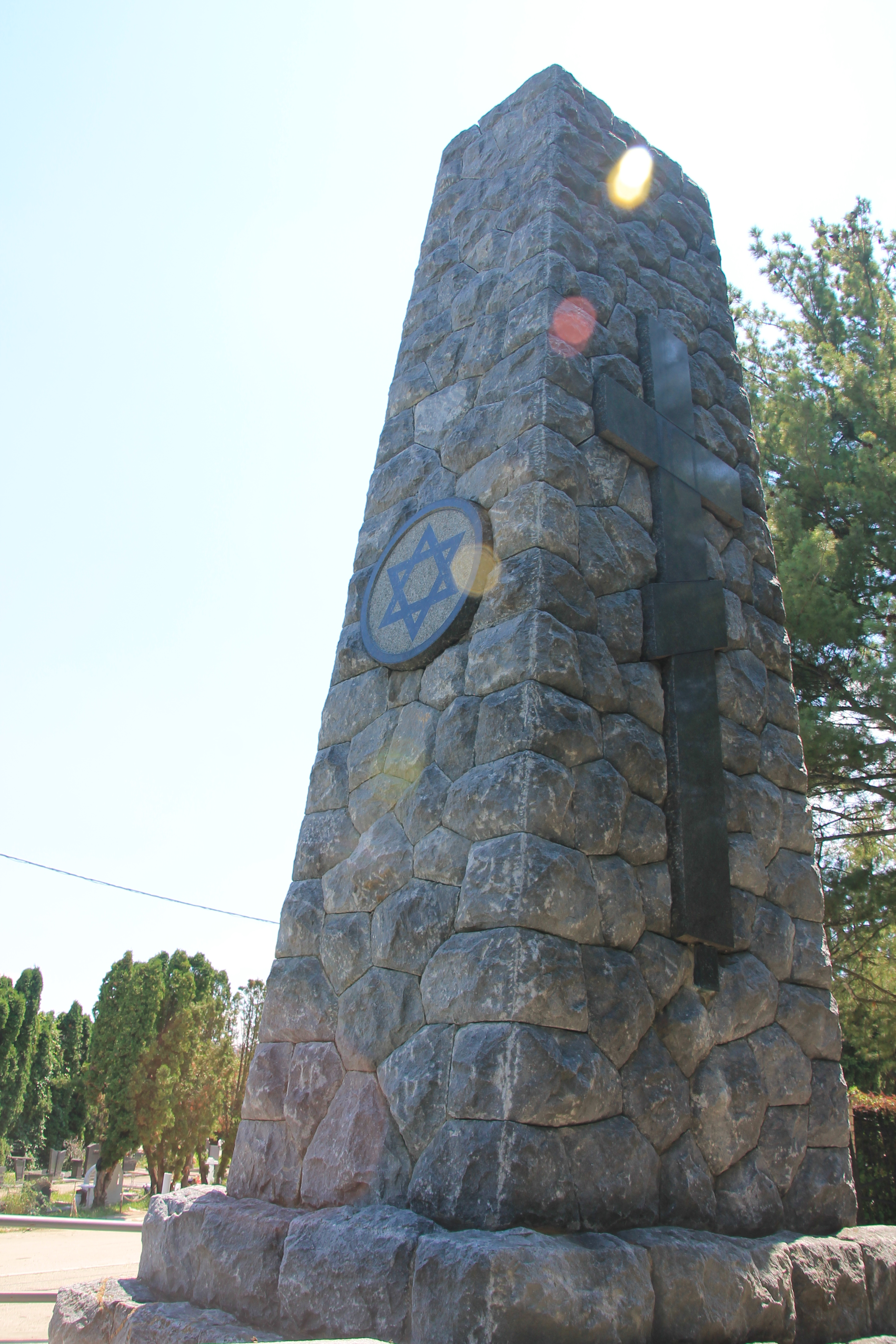
Monument to soldiers of four faiths

The Memorial ossuary to fallen soldiers in 1912-1918 or Monument to soldiers of four faiths is a war memorial erected on September 23, 1934 to soldiers who lost their lives during the Balkans and the First World War in Čačak, Serbia. Symbols of four religious communities are engraved on the monument: Orthodox, Catholic, Islamic and Jewish. It is a unique example of respect for soldiers of all nations and religions, both in war and in peace.

== History ==
Memorial ossuary unveiling ceremony on September 23, 1934.

Between the two world wars, the ladies from Čačak, led by teacher Milica Obradović, founded the women's section of the "Association of Reserve Officers and Warriors" - FIDAC (French: Fédération Interallié des Anciens Combattants) on October 22, 1928. At that time, still under the influence of dramatic events from the First World War, they pledged to fight for world peace, take care of war veterans and members of their families, arrange military cemeteries, and celebrate dates related to the First World War. The section paid special attention to finding the graves of soldiers of both warring parties who died in the wider region of the Čačak in the wars of 1912-1918, and transferring their remains to a joint memorial ossuary.

At one point, they were faced with the fact that there were fallen soldiers of different nations and religions.

Above the ossuary, according to the idea of the Čačak engineer Isidor Janjić (the father of the well known meteorologist Zaviša Janjić), the local stonecutter Francesco Berbelja of Italian origin, built a monument in the shape of an obelisk made of blue stone delivered from his quarry (Francesco's "blue stone" is still being exploited in Serbia ). On each side, made of granite, there are four different symbols: the Orthodox cross, the Catholic cross, the Islamic crescent and the Jewish Star of David.

The funeral ended on August 5, 1934, with the symbolic transfer of the remains of three soldiers. Along with Beethoven's "Posthumous March ", the procession set off from the city towards the memorial ossuary. The monument was unveiled by the king's envoy Oscar Casca, on September 23, 1934, in the presence of representatives of the embassies of France, England, Belgium, Italy, Germany, Bulgaria, Romania and Turkey, as well as priests of all four faiths.

The ossuary houses 652 remains of Serbian and 262 soldiers of Central Powers who died and were buried in Čačak region during the First World War. A total of 914 remains housed in the ossuary.

In April 1941, Germany and Italy launched an invasion of the Kingdom of Yugoslavia. In 1942, the German occupation authorities in Čačak ordered the stonecutter Francesca Berbelja to remove religious symbols representing Judaism and the Islamic religion from the Memorial Ossuary.

By removing the Star of David and the crescent moon with the star, the Nazis tried to devalue and make meaningless the existence of the monument and its symbolism.
