= List of museums in Belgrade =

This is a list of museums in Belgrade, the capital of Serbia.

== Art museums ==
- Museum of Illusions (Nušićeva 11)
- Museum of African Art (Andre Nikolića 14)
- Museum of Applied Arts (Vuka Karadžica 18)
- Museum of Contemporary Art (Ušće bb)
- Legacy of Milica Zorić and Rodoljub Čolaković (Rodoljuba Čolakovića 2), part of Museum of Contemporary Art
- Belgrade City Museum (Resavska 40b)
- Museum of Paja Jovanović, (Kralja Milana 21/VI), part of Belgrade City Museum
- Zepter Museum (Knez Mihailova 42)
- Gallery of Frescos, (Cara Uroša 20), part of National Museum of Serbia

== Cultural and historical museums ==
- National Museum of Serbia (Trg republike 1a)
- Historical Museum of Serbia (Trg Nikole Pašića 11)
- Museum of Yugoslav History (Mihaila Mike Jankovica 6), with 3 buildings: House of Flowers (Tito's tomb), Old museum (Tito's gifts and documents about Yugoslavian history) and Museum 25 May (temporary exhibitions)
- Historical Museum of Genocide dedicated to the Serbian people (Trg Nikole Pašića 11)
- Jewish Historical Museum (Kralja Petra I 71/1)
- Konak Kneginje Ljubice (Kneza Sime Markovića 3), part of Belgrade City Museum
- Konak Kneza Miloša (Rakovički put 2), part of Historical Museum of Serbia
- Military Museum (Kalemegdan)
- Museum of Belgrade Fortress (Kalemegdan)
- Museum of Ethnography (Studentski trg 13)
- Museum of Vuk and Dositej, (Gospodar Jevremova 21), part of National Museum of Serbia
- Museum of Pedagogy (Uzun Mirkova 14)
- Museum of Serbian Orthodox Church
- Museum of the "Banjica" Concentration Camp (Veljka Lukića Kurjaka 3)
- Museum of Theatrical Arts (Gospodar Jevremova 19)
- Museum of Yugoslav Film Archive (Kosovska 11)
- Zemun Home Museum (Glavna 9)
- House of Jevrem Grujic (Svetogorska 17)
- Museum of Roma Culture in Belgrade (Husinske rudara 31, Karaburma)

== Memorial museums and commemorative collections ==
- Manak's House (Gavrila Principa 5)
- Memorial Gallery of Petar Dobrović (Kralja Petra I 36/IV)
- Memorial Museum of Ivo Andrić (Andrićev venac 8/I), part of Belgrade City Museum
- Memorial Museum of Jovan Cvijić (Jelene Ćetković 5), part of Belgrade City Museum
- Memorial Museum of Nadežda and Rastko Petrović (Ljube Stojanovića 25), part of Belgrade City Museum
- Museum of Archibald Reiss (Bulevar vojvode Mišića 73)
- Museum of FK "Crvena Zvezda" (Ljutice Bogdana 1a)
- Museum of Physical Education (Blagoja Parovića 156)
- Museum of Toma Rosandić (Vasilija Gaceše 3)

== Technical and natural-history museums ==
- Museum of Automobiles (Majke Jevrosime 30)
- Aviation Museum, near Belgrade Nikola Tesla Airport, has a collection consisting of 130 planes including the only remaining Fiat G.50 Freccia and two NATO aircraft shot down in 1999.
- Museum of Natural History (Njegoševa 51; Mali Kalemegdan 1)
- Museum of Science and Technology (Ðure Jakšica 9)
- Nikola Tesla Museum (Krunska 51)
- PTT Museum (Palmoticeva 2)
- Railway Museum (Nemanjina 6)

== See also ==
- List of museums in Serbia
