= Church of the Holy Apostles Peter and Paul, Topčider =

Church in Belgrade, Serbia

Coordinates: 44.7812°N 20.4439°E

Church of the Holy Apostles Peter and Paul, Topčider Топчидерска црква Светих апостола Петра и Павла
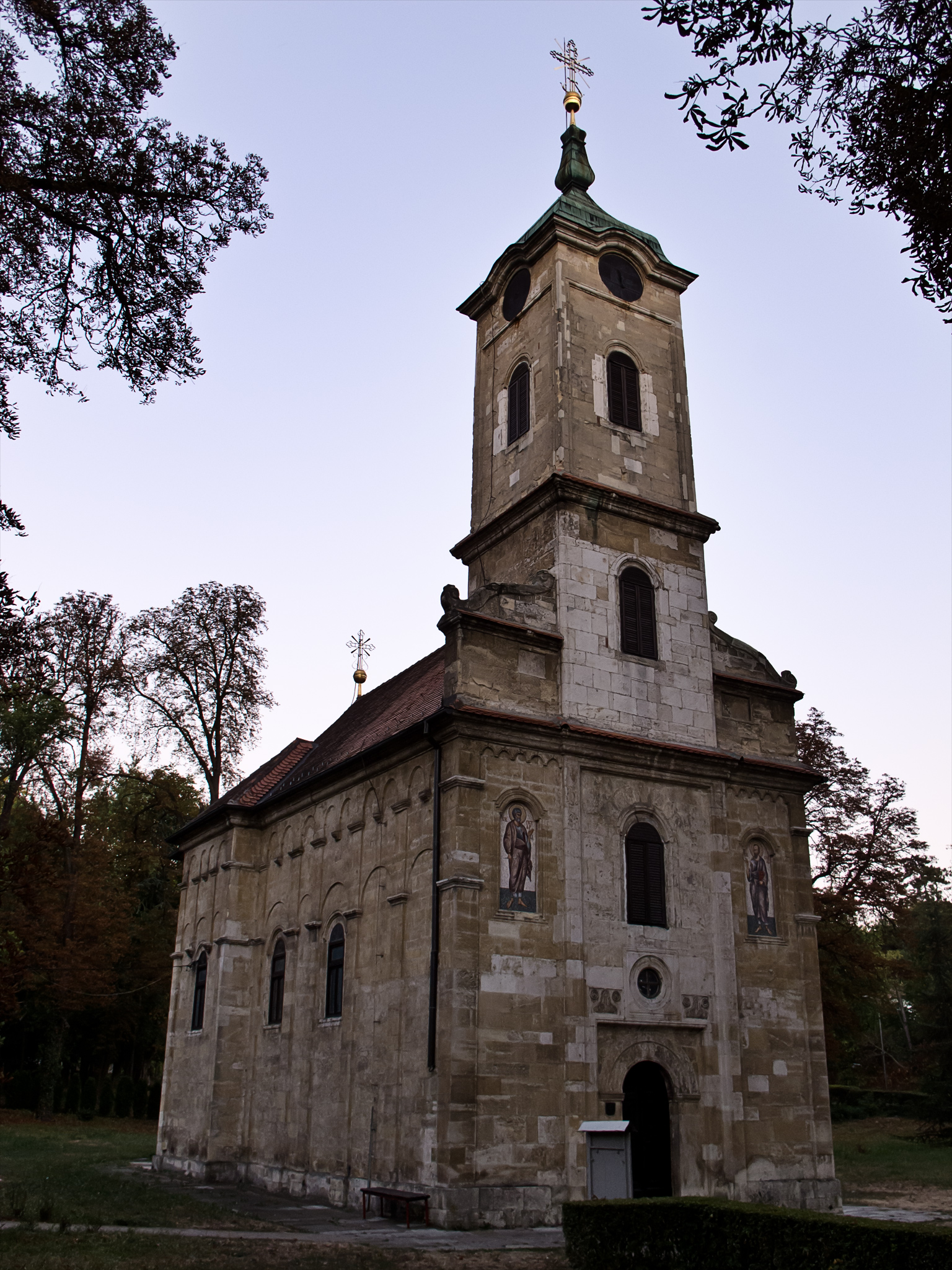

- Location within Serbia

Religion
- Affiliation: Serbian Orthodox Church
- Year consecrated: 1834

Location
- Location: Belgrade, Serbia
- Interactive map of Church of the Holy Apostles Peter and Paul, Topčider; Топчидерска црква Светих апостола Петра и Павла

Architecture
- Architects: Janja Mihajlović; Nikola Đorđević; Hadži Nikola Živković
- Completed: 1834
- Materials: stone
- Cultural Heritage of Serbia
- Official name: Topčiderska crkva
- Type: Cultural monument of Exceptional Importance
- Designated: 2 December 1946
- Reference no.: SK 6

Church of the Holy Apostles Peter and Paul, known as the Topčider Church (Serbian Cyrillic: Топчидерска црква) is the Serbian Orthodox Church, located in Topčider park, in the municipality of Savski Venac in Belgrade, the capital of Serbia. Built between 1832 and 1834, it was an endowment of Prince Miloš Obrenović, who was also its founder. It is located next to the Residence of Prince Miloš. The church was declared a cultural monument and protected by the state in 1949.

== Origin ==
During the First Serbian Uprising, Serbian leader Karađorđe realized the importance of Topčider valley for the military and economic blockade of Belgrade Fortress, held by Ottomans at the time. During one of the sieges, Miloš Obrenović was charged with keeping the road to Valjevo and Kragujevac closed. However, he reached an agreement with the Ottomans and allowed their army to pass. Infuriated Karađorđe captured Miloš and took him to the old, abandoned cemetery in Topčider, to kill him. After pleadings of vojvoda Mladen Milovanović, Karađorđe spared Miloš's life. Historians believe that this was actually the only time that Karađorđe drew his flintlock at someone, without killing him.

In memory of this "miracle", when he became ruler, Prince Miloš decided to build a church and a konak for the Serbian Metropolitan of Belgrade. However, Prince Miloš organized assassinations of both Karađorđe (in 1817) and Mladenović (in 1823), so it could be the church was built because of remorse (see Pokajnica Monastery).

== Construction ==
Construction began on 28 July 1832 and was conducted by Janja Mihajlović, Nikola Đorđević and Hadži Nikola Živković. As the workers were paid poorly by the prince, and with delays, the construction dragged until summer 1834, with short interruptions. The prince's penny-pinching also resulted in the selection of the materials for the church. The bell tower and konak are partially built from the old headstones. On one of them, on the back side of the tower, the horse pliers are carved pointing to the profession of the deceased (farrier).

== Characteristics ==
Prince Miloš donated three bells to the church. During the occupation by Austria-Hungary in World War I, two of them were removed and transported to Vienna. With other bells gathered from other Orthodox churches in occupied countries, Austro-Hungarian Army melted them and used them for the arms production. The third bell, a smallest one, survived until today.

The church has an unusual iconostasis. The first one, work of several painters, was done from 1834 to 1837. In 1874 it was relocated to the parish church in the village of Barič. Present iconostasis is a work of Stevan Todorović, a renowned artist and painter, and his collaborator Nikola Marković. Todorović's originality is noticeable in certain departures from the usual choice of motifs and layout of the icons. Instead of Saint Archdeacon Stephen on the south altar doors, he painted young Tobias in company of angels, as a representation and symbol of the burdened mankind. Above, Todorović painted the Saint Stefan Dečanski, while John the Baptist was replaced with Saint Sava who, in turn, doesn't resemble at all the best known Sava's representation, in the Mileševa monastery. As a curiosity, none of the saints is painted with a halo. Carvings were done by sculptor Dimitrije Petrović.

The church and the adjoining konak were placed under the state protection in 1949.

== Present ==
The church is under reconstruction, which is expected to be completed by 2015, two hundred years since the start of the Second Serbian Uprising.

== See also ==
- Churches of Belgrade
