= Museum of Roma Culture in Belgrade =

Museum in Belgrade, Serbia

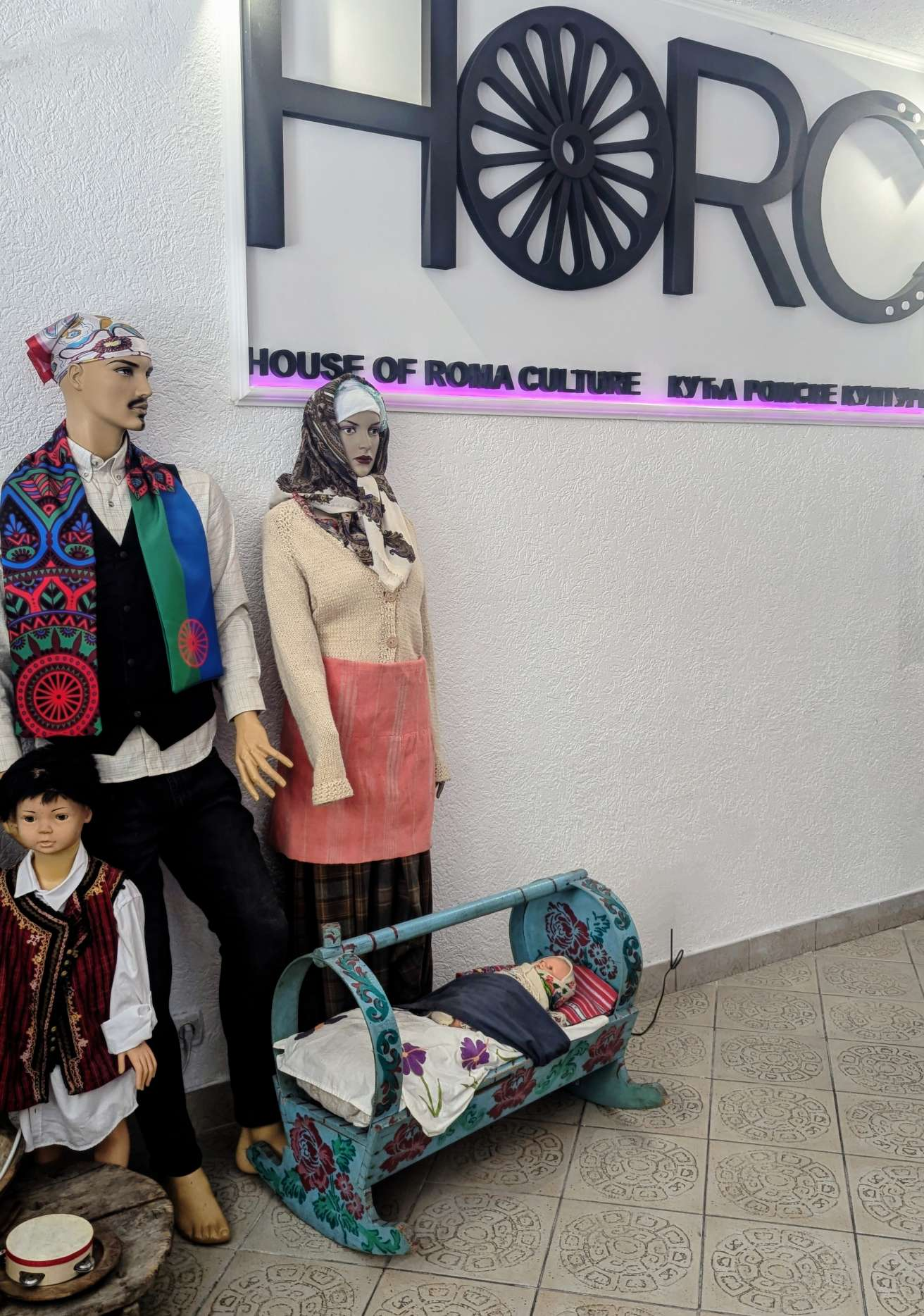
Museum of Roma Culture in Belgrade

The Museum of Roma Culture in Belgrade (Serbian: Музеј ромске културе у Београду, romanized: Muzej romske kulture u Beogradu) is the first Roma museum in Southeastern Europe, while otherwise the heritage of Roma culture is most often displayed as permanent exhibitions in museums with a different main focus.

== History ==
The Museum of Roma Culture was opened on October 21, 2009, under the auspices of the City of Belgrade, on the ground floor of a building in Rooseveltova Street 41–43 in Belgrade, in an area of 72 m2 in total.

The founder of the museum is the Roma Community Center "April 8". The museum began its work by opening the exhibition "Alav e Romengo" ("The Word of Roma"), by Dragoljub Ackovic, where about 100,000 documents from Roma culture were available to visitors as well as copies of original books.

In 2011, the museum moved from Roosevelt to a larger space at 31a Husinske rudara Street on Karaburma (Belgrade's Palilula municipality). The new space is a donation from the Serbian Orthodox Slogan organization, and the city of Belgrade has also participated in the fitting out. It occupies an area of 180 m2, and the former space became the Roma Art Galery.

The museum exhibits the material and spiritual culture of the Roma, and the Gallery exhibits works by Roma visual artists from Serbia and the world.

== Exhibitions ==
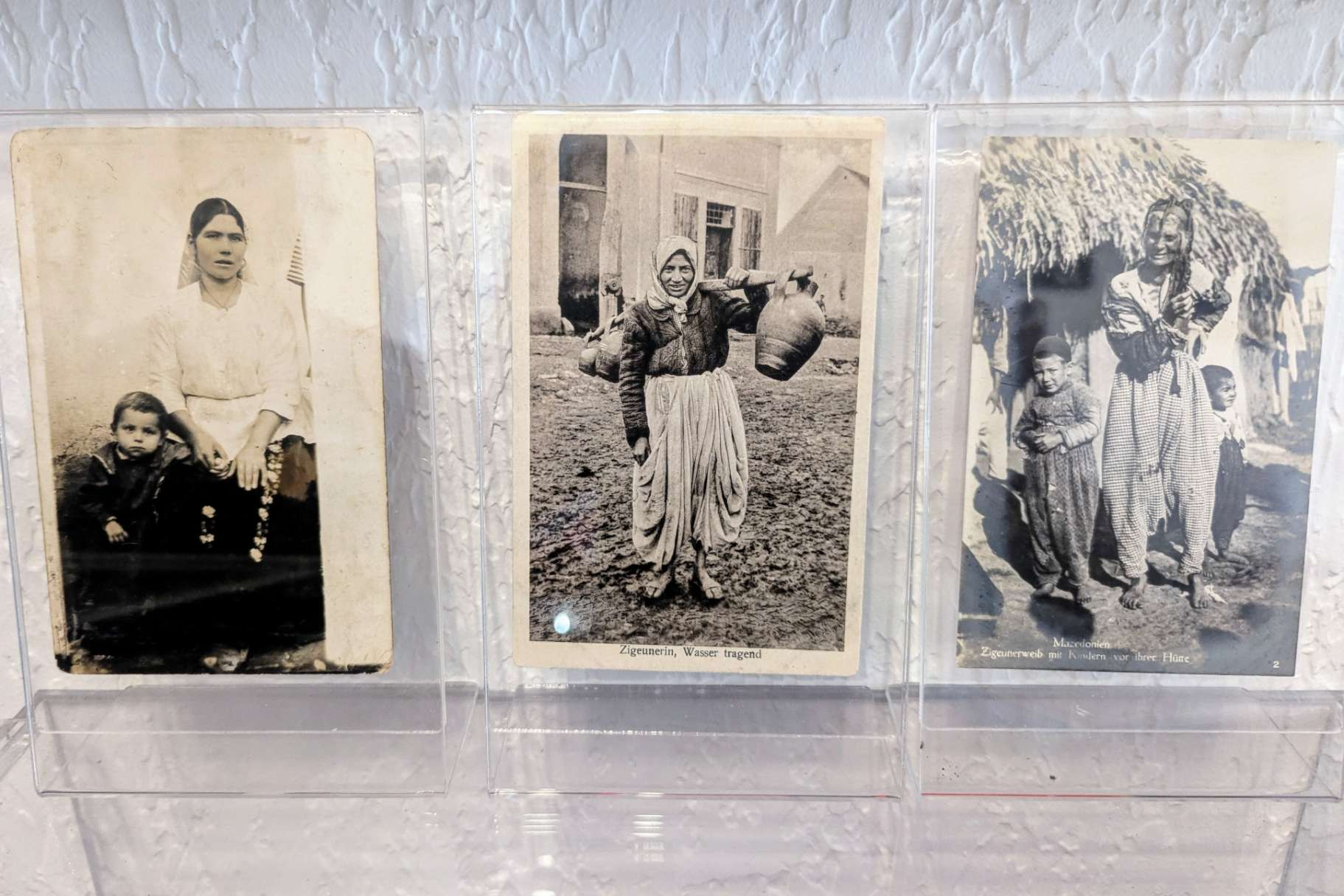
Historic photographs at the Museum of Roma Culture in Belgrade

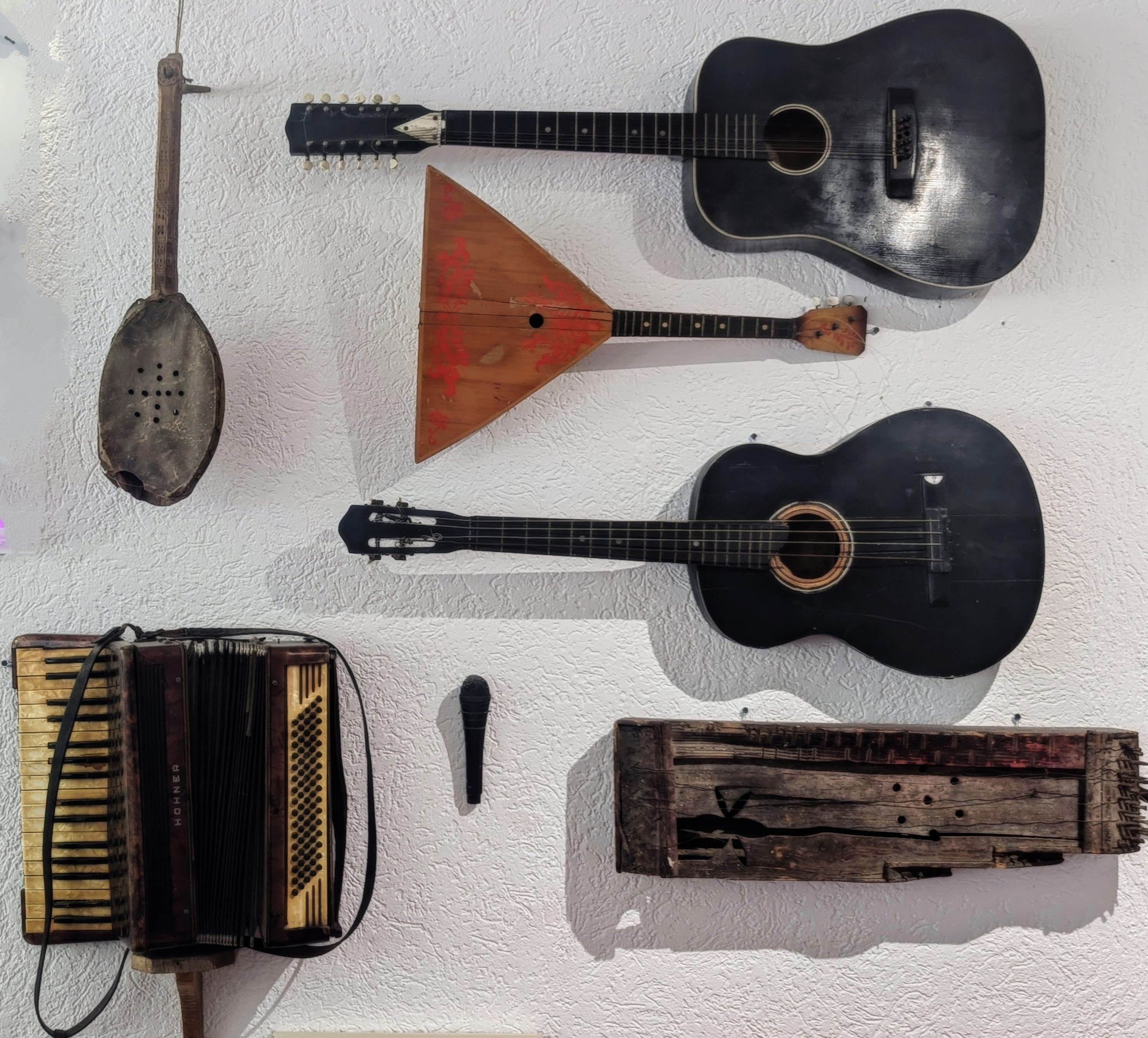
Ethnographic objects at the Museum of Roma Culture in Belgrade

Visitors to the museum were presented with the permanent exhibition "Material Culture of Roma in Serbia" - written Roma culture, customs, history of Holocaust suffering and other facts from the history and culture of Roma.

=== Collections ===
The exhibits for the museum have been collected for decades and in recent years have been renewed. The collection includes ethnographic objects (such as costumes, tools, musical instruments), as well as historic photographs, documents, and art. In addition to the permanent exhibit, about ten thousand documents of Roma culture are stored in ten computers, a prerequisite for the creation of a virtual museum, which would allow anyone who wants to learn about any element of that culture to do so from anywhere in the world.

The museum exhibits, among other things:

- twenty Romani dictionaries from different countries of the world,
- a unique Serbian-Roma-German dictionary, authored by Svetozar Simic, and compiled in 1942 during the Second World War in a German concentration camp, as can be seen from the camp seals in several places,
- the first book on Roma from 1803, some of which were written in the Romani language and authored by Petar Aksibarković,
- the first Bible translated into Romany in Serbia in 1938,
- copies of the Romano lil newspaper, published in Belgrade in 1935,
- the first Romani text in the world, published in 1537 in England.

== Other activities to promote Roma culture ==
In addition to the exhibition, lectures in the field of romology are organized on the premises of the museum where interested people can become more familiar with Roma culture, history and language. The museum also organizes evening events dedicated to Roma poetry and music.

In 2019, at the initiative of the Museum of Roma Culture, the Roma holiday Tetkica Bibija was included in the National Register of Intangible Cultural Heritage of Serbia. This religious holiday celebrates the healer Bibi as a protector of the family and children's health.

== See also ==
- List of museums in Belgrade
- List of museums in Serbia
