= A Resting Bashi-Bazouk =

Painting by Paja Jovanović

- Одмор башибозука (Serbian)
- Artist: Paja Jovanović
- Year: 1887–1888
- Medium: Oil on panel
- Dimensions: 41 cm × 32.5 cm (16 in × 12.8 in)
- Location: Belgrade City Museum; Belgrade

Rest of the Bashibozuk (Serbian: Одмор башибозука, Odmor bašibozuka), also known as the Arnaut warrior and the Albanian warrior, is an oil painting on panel by the Serbian artist Paja Jovanović, created c. 1887–88. It is an example of academic art from the artist's early-career Orientalist phase. The picture shows an armed bashi-bozuk relaxing with tea or coffee and smoking hookah.

Resting Bashibozuk is currently held in the collection of the Belgrade City Museum, which houses the legacy of Paja Jovanović.
