= Janja (disambiguation) =

Janja is a town in Bijeljina, Bosnia and Herzegovina. Janja may also refer to:

== People ==
- Janja Garnbret (born 1999), a Slovenian professional rock climber
- Janja Kantakouzenos (d. 1477), a medieval nobleman
- Janja Lalich (born 1945), an American sociologist and writer
- Janja Mihailović, a Serbian architect
- Janja Šegel (born 2001), a Slovenian swimmer
- Janja Vidmar (born 1962), a Slovenian author and screenwriter
- Rosângela Lula da Silva (born 1966), a Brazilian sociologist and First Lady of Brazil

== Other uses ==
- Janja Monastery, a Serbian Orthodox monastery
- Janja, the antagonist hyena character from The Lion Guard television series
