= Nikola Đorđević =

Nikola Đorđević may refer to:

- Nikola Đorđević (architect), Serbian architect
- Nikola Đorđević (footballer, born 1993), Serbian association football forward
- Nikola Đorđević (footballer, born 1994), Serbian association football forward
