= Janja Mihailović =

Serbian architect

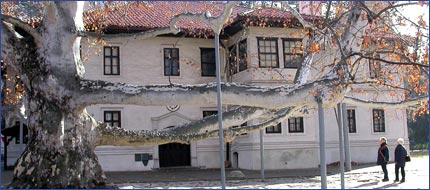
- Konak of Prince Miloš in Belgrade.
- Known for: Architect
- Movement: Eclecticism

Janja Mihailović (in Serbian Cyrillic: Јања Михаиловић) was a Serbian architect from the beginning of the 19th century. His work is characteristic of the architectural tradition of this period, between traditional contributions and openings to Western influences.

== Works ==
His two most famous achievements are the Residence of Prince Miloš in Belgrade, in the Topčider district, built between 1831 and 1833. and the Church of St. Peter and St. Paul in Topčider, built between 1832 and 1834, which mixed traditional influences and references to popular Western architecture classical architecture and Baroque architecture. These two works are respectively classified on the list of exceptional importance and on the list of great importance in Serbia. These two buildings were created in collaboration with the architect Nikola Đorđević.
