= Bibi (Romani cult) =

Religious holiday

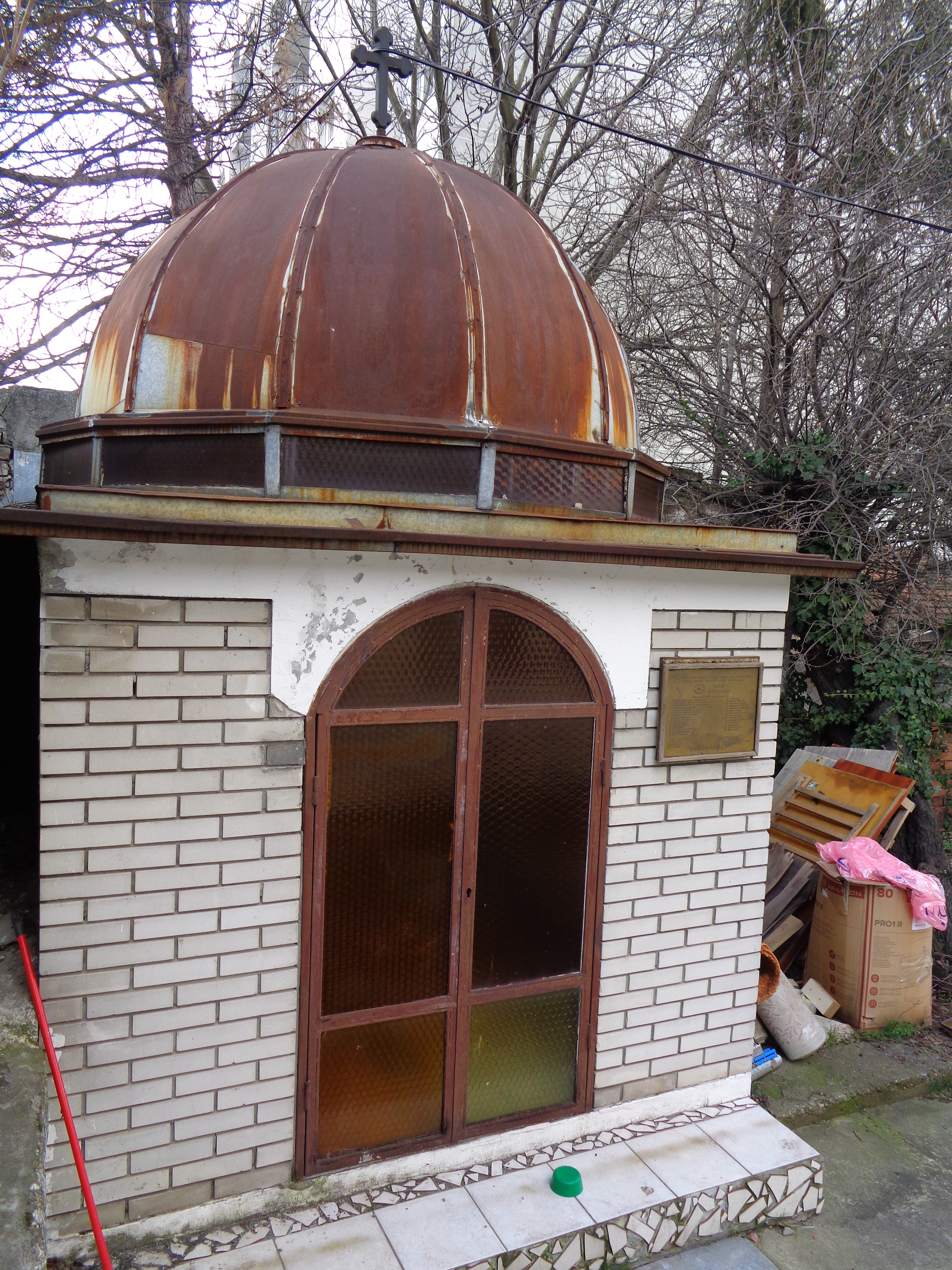
Chapel of Saint Bibi, Belgrade

Bibijako Dive (Auntie Day) is a religious holiday celebrated by the majority of Orthodox Christian Romani people and, to a lesser degree, Muslim Roma from the Balkans and in the diaspora. Bibi is celebrated as a healer and protector of the family and children's health, and is the Roma version of the Hindu goddess Shashthi. Each region has its own date for the holiday; as is explained by legend, Bibi traveled to different places on different dates and performed healing. The dates of the holiday are associated with Easter fasting and are therefore mobile. Among Eastern Orthodox celebrants, the presence of a priest is obligatory (even though Auntie Bibi is a non-canonized saint).

In different cultural milieus, Bibi is also called Healer Bibi or Bibiyaku. In Romani, "bibi" means "aunt"; the diminutive of which is "bibiori". Auntie Bibi's holiday was listed in the National Register of Intangible cultural heritage of Serbia in 2019.

Bibi is one of the few Roma Slava household deities. In addition to Bibi, many Roma families celebrate its own Slava (such as Babo Fingo at Kakava), as well as other religious holidays, such as Easter, Christmas, and Bayram (Turkey).

== Customs during the celebration in Serbia ==
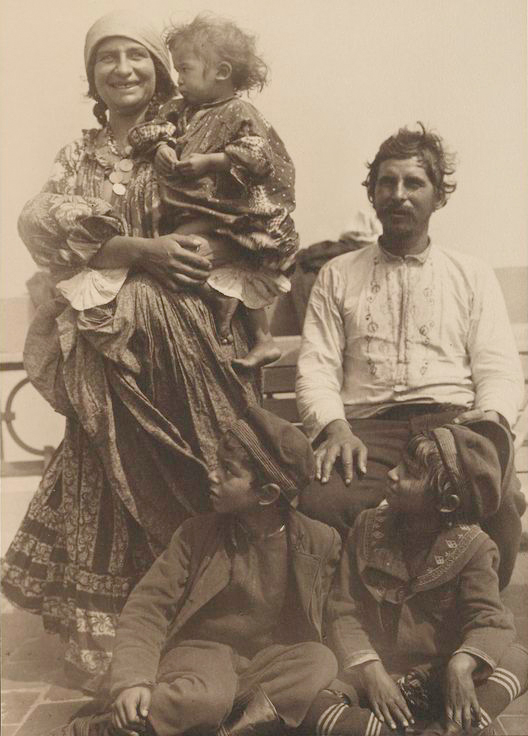
Romani family from Serbia (1905)

Bibi is celebrated collectively, with all Romani people in Serbia gathering at a holy place – usually a tree or cross, bringing a celebratory cake and food, and in some places, gifts for a Bibia (comb, mirror and children's clothes) hang on to a holy tree. On the Day of celebration, after the service in the Orthodox Church, the Roma go on a procession, carrying the cake and candles and shouting: "To the health of Bibi (Auntie)!" (Romani: Bibijako sostipe!). Everyone who celebrates brings cake and fast dishes to serve guests under their native tree, usually pear or walnut tree. Under the tree, the host of the next glory is determined and the slava cake is handed over. It is celebrated with songs and dance, and children receive packets full of sweets.

== Celebration of Bibi in Muslim communities ==
Bibi is well known among Muslim Roma communities in the Balkan, as well as in the wider region. Muslim Roma celebrate it for their holiday Djisatedimi.

Ethnographic literature does not provide reliable information on whether Muslim Roma celebrate Bibijako Djive. According to ethnographer Aleksandar Petrović, Muslim Roma in Kruševac (Serbia) had adopted the Bibijako Djive feast from Christian Roma, and they celebrate it on the same day, but at night. Leading up the holy day, they fast for several days and the celebration starts at sundown. Dragoljub Acković, the author of two monographs on Bibi (2004; 2010), also reports that ethnographic literature does not contain information on the celebration of Bibijako Djive by Muslim Roma. However, in the 2010 monograph Acković references information gathered among Muslim Roma from Prizren, Uroševac or Ferizaj (Kosovo) and Belgrade (the capital of Serbia) which indicates that these Muslim Roman communities celebrated Bibijako Djive for the sake of protecting their children from disease, but that the celebration of the Bibi cult lasts an entire month, from 31 January to 1 March.

== See also ==
- Romani society and culture
