= Residence of Princess Ljubica =

Palace in Belgrade, Serbia

- Конак књегиње Љубице
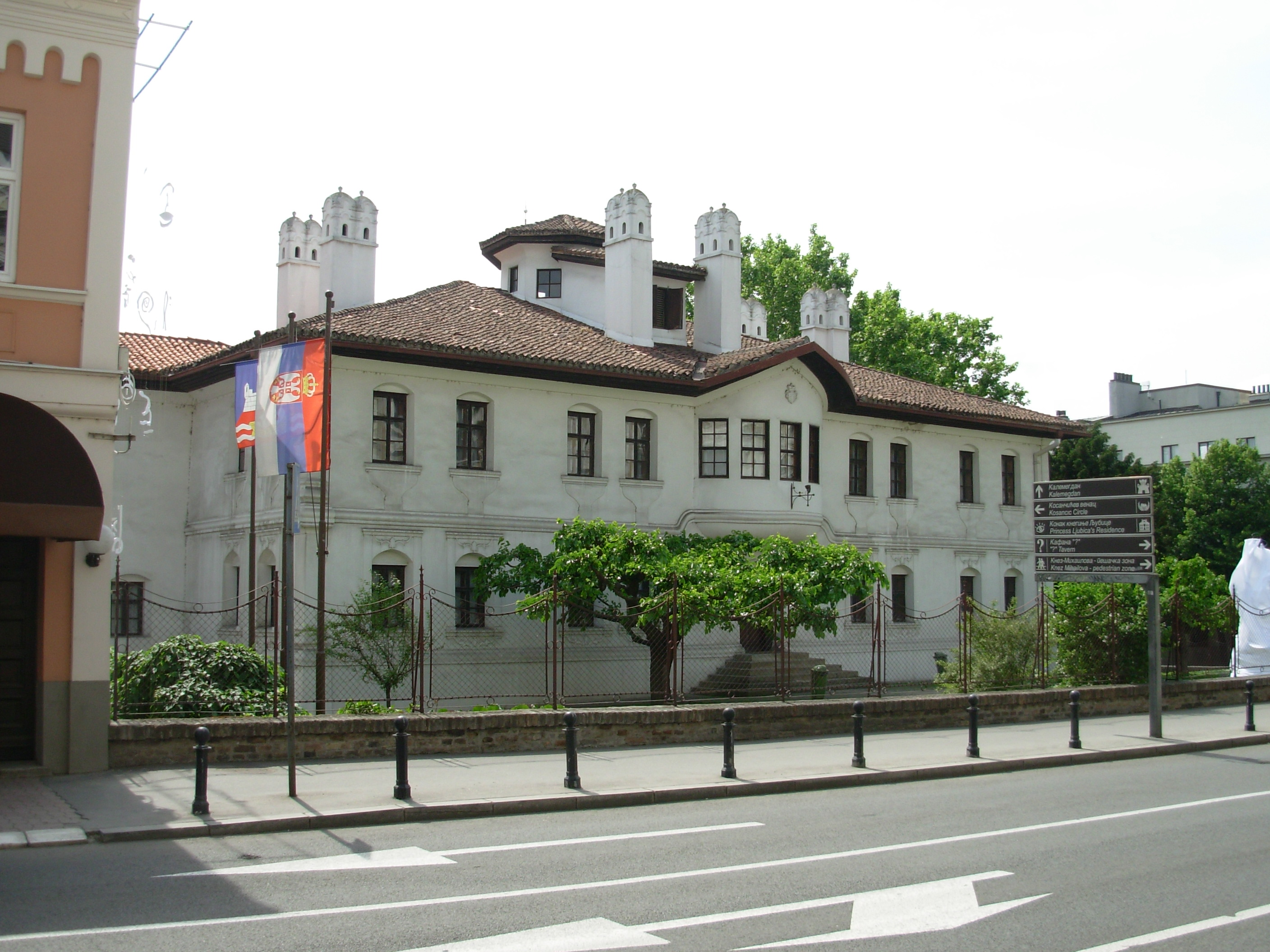
- Front view and main entrance
- Interactive map of the Residence of Princess Ljubica area

General information
- Status: Monument of Culture of Exceptional Importance
- Location: Stari Grad, Belgrade, Serbia
- Coordinates: 44°49′02″N 20°27′08″E
- Completed: 1830

Design and construction
- Architect: Hadži-Neimar

Cultural Heritage of Serbia
- Type: Cultural Monument of Exceptional Importance
- Designated: 5 September 1946
- Reference no.: SK 2

The Residence of Princess Ljubica (Serbian: Конак књегиње Љубице, romanized: Konak knjeginje Ljubice) is a palace located in Belgrade, Serbia.

== History ==
The palace was used for living until 1829, but taking into consideration its age and state Prince Miloš Obrenović had decided to build another residence in Topčider. New residence was larger and more exclusive as it was supposed to show the economic growth and further strengthening of power of house of Obrenović after having received the Hatisherif (Sultan's Edict) in 1830.

The building is one of the most remarkable among the preserved examples of civil architecture of Belgrade from the first half of the 19th century. It was built during the period from 1829 to 1830. According to plans of Prince Miloš, the residence was supposed to have a twofold purpose – to be a home for his family, Princess Ljubica and his sons Milan and Mihailo (later rulers of Serbia) and at the same time a residential palace. It was built according to ideas and under supervision of Hadži-Neimar, the pioneer of Serbian building and construction.

Prince Miloš decided to hire a constructor from Eddesa, Hadži Nikola Živković, since there were none in Belgrade at that time for there were no construction activities for years. Thus Hadži-Neimar became the first builder of restored Serbia managing all of Prince Miloš's buildings during his first reign. Foundation was laid in July 1829, and the building was completed in late autumn of 1830. Princess Ljubica informed her husband in a letter from November 22, 1830 that "they have settled in the new residence". A new hammam (bathhouse), with one-storey wing was built in 1836.

One of the first records about Princess Ljubica Residence is from travel-writer Otto Dubislav Pirch, from 1892: “One small part of Belgrade stands out in comparison to others, and this is one small place at the Southwest end of the upper town main street. (…) Although not the largest in its form it is the most beautiful building I have seen in Serbia“.1 Consistent to its intended function, the new Residence differed from the common private houses and it “contains certain characteristics which (…) place it among fortified palaces of great Pashas and wealthy Beys (tur. for a leader of a small region or province)“.

Princess Ljubica, modest by nature, wanted to arrange a high life in the palace. Saved correspondence between the Princess and Prince Miloš from January 1, 1831 states that the Princess asked her husband “to provide red socks for servants in the palace“. Presumably, the Princess got a negative reply, considering that in the letter from January 24 she claims “that she can manage without any servants“.

During the first reign of Prince Miloš, main state treasury was situated at the palace. Princedom Regency held their sessions in the palace until the return of Prince Miahilo to Serbia in 1840, who lived there until 1842.

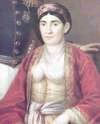
Princess consort Ljubica Vukomanović

The Belgrade Lyceum moved in 1846 and was located there until 1863, then the First Grammar School of Belgrade and the Supreme Court of Appeals until 1905. The Institution for Education of Deaf Children was located here in 1912 until 1929 when Contemporary Art Museum moved in and stayed there until 1934. AfterwardsThe Residence housed the Museum of the Serbian Orthodox Church Church, 1941. Part of the Serbian Patriarchate was located here from 1945–47 and the Institute for Cultural Heritage Preservation from 1947 until 1971.

Preservation and restoration works were performed during the period from 1971 to 1979, when rehabilitation and renewal of facades and interiors were carried out. On that occasion, Residence of Princess Ljubica, from than on an integral part of the Belgrade City Museum, was adapted for a permanent museum exhibition.

Because of its cultural and architectural importance the Residence of Princess Ljubica has been designated a Monument of Culture of Exceptional Importance in 1979.

== Location ==
It is situated at the corner of Kneza Sime Markovića Street and Kralja Petra Street, in one of the oldest parts of Belgrade. Just across the present Cathedral Church the Old palace of Prince was situated stretching from the entrance of today's Palace of the Patriarchate to the garden of Residence of Princess Ljubica.

Residence of Princess Ljubica is placed in a free space in the center of a garden, initially fenced by a high wall as other buildings of this type and surrounded by greenery. It had an outer yard where one could enter through the car entrance as well as the spacious inner garden toward Kosančicev Venac. It faces the Sava river with its main façade dominated by a bay window of the divanhana (turkish: a room used for smoking and talking).

== Architecture ==
Residence's base has a rectangular form and is proportionally large; it has three levels – basement, ground floor and an upper storey. The basement is covered by vaults while ground and upper storey have been built in classic brickwork and ”bondruk” manner with timber construction filled with unbaked bricks. Four slopes roof is covered with tiles with an octagonal dome and eight chimneys on it.

This building has all characteristics of city houses of Serbian-Balkan style. Ground and upper storey have a centre hall around which all other rooms are situated, showing a traditional Oriental space concept, which originates from former closed inner yard model. There are divanhanas on both floors, which is a type of today's dining room, but also a reception salon. The ground floor divanhana is separated from the rest of the area by two steps and lined by wooden columns divided with parapets. Wide stairs, leading into garden, are located immediately beside it and this entrance is wider than the one leading toward the street.

The other divanhana, on the upper floor, is more intimate. It is lined with walls on the side, and it has only two columns facing the central space. Its floor was in line with the surrounding floor and they were all made out of wood. This divanhana is overviewing the street.

Although leaning to Oriental tradition with its spacious concept, Residence of Princess Ljubica represents the breaking point in architecture of Belgrade, because it largely indicates the influence of European architecture with its exterior design and decorative elements. These European concepts are especially notable in diversity of facades, broken roof lines, chimneys and dome, in secondary details of architectonic façade treatment – pilasters, arch endings and window surroundings, profiled wreaths and some interior details. Bay windows on a façade of Residence of Princess Ljubica which are usually rectangular have a half-circular base.

== Gallery ==
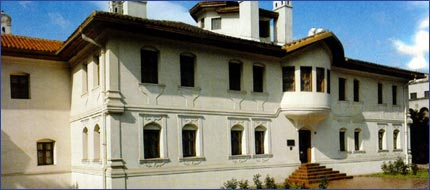

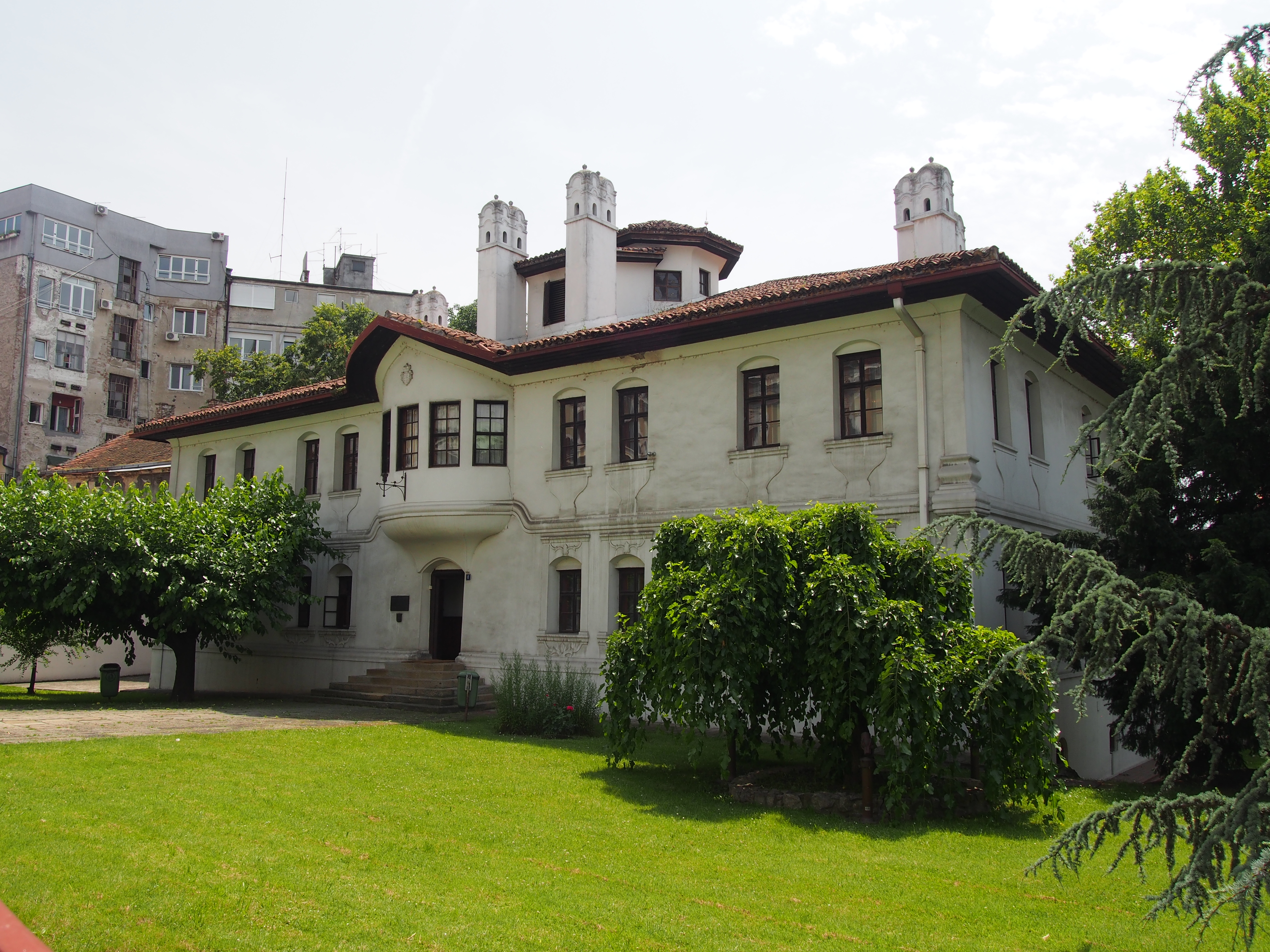

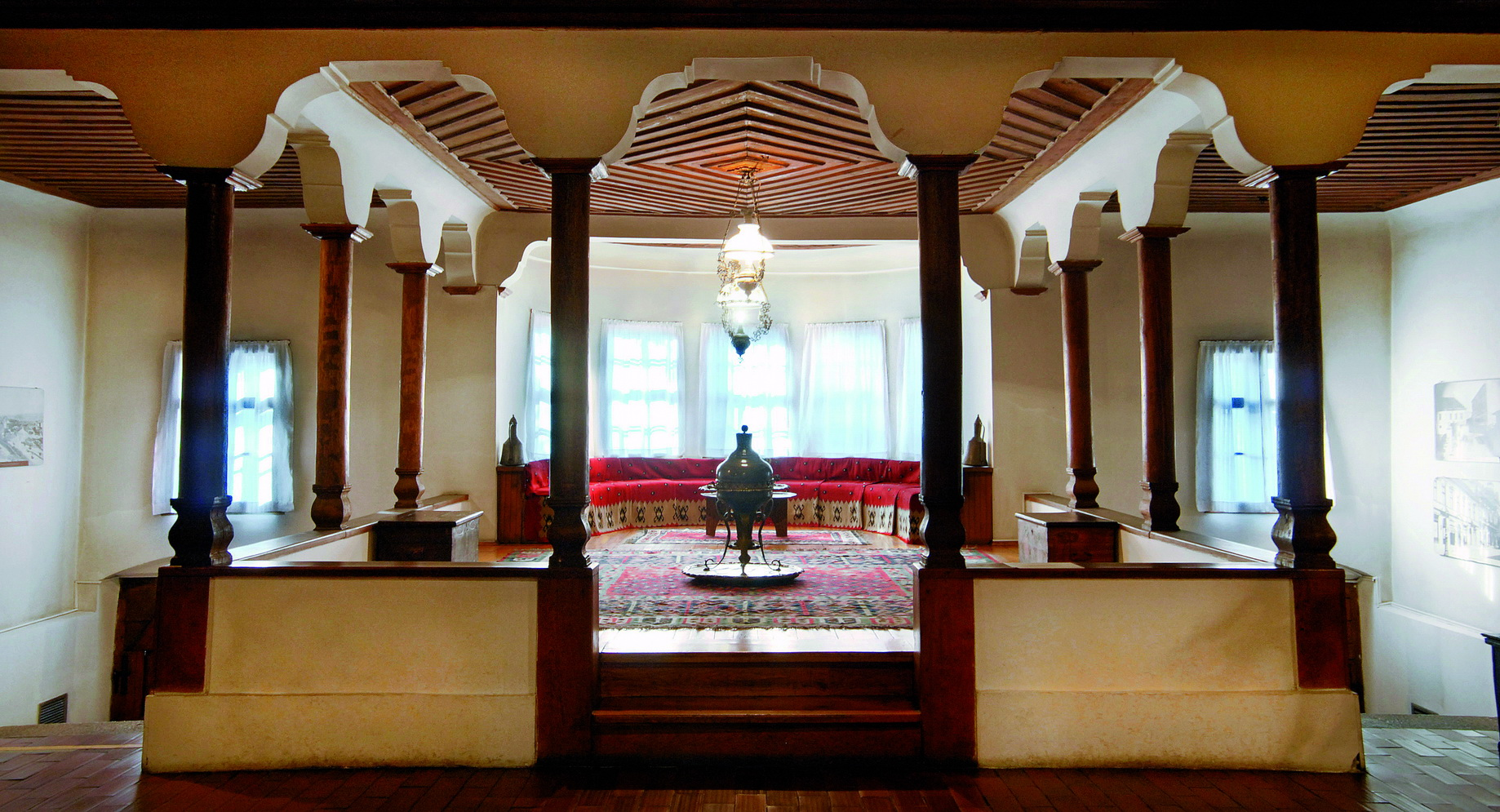

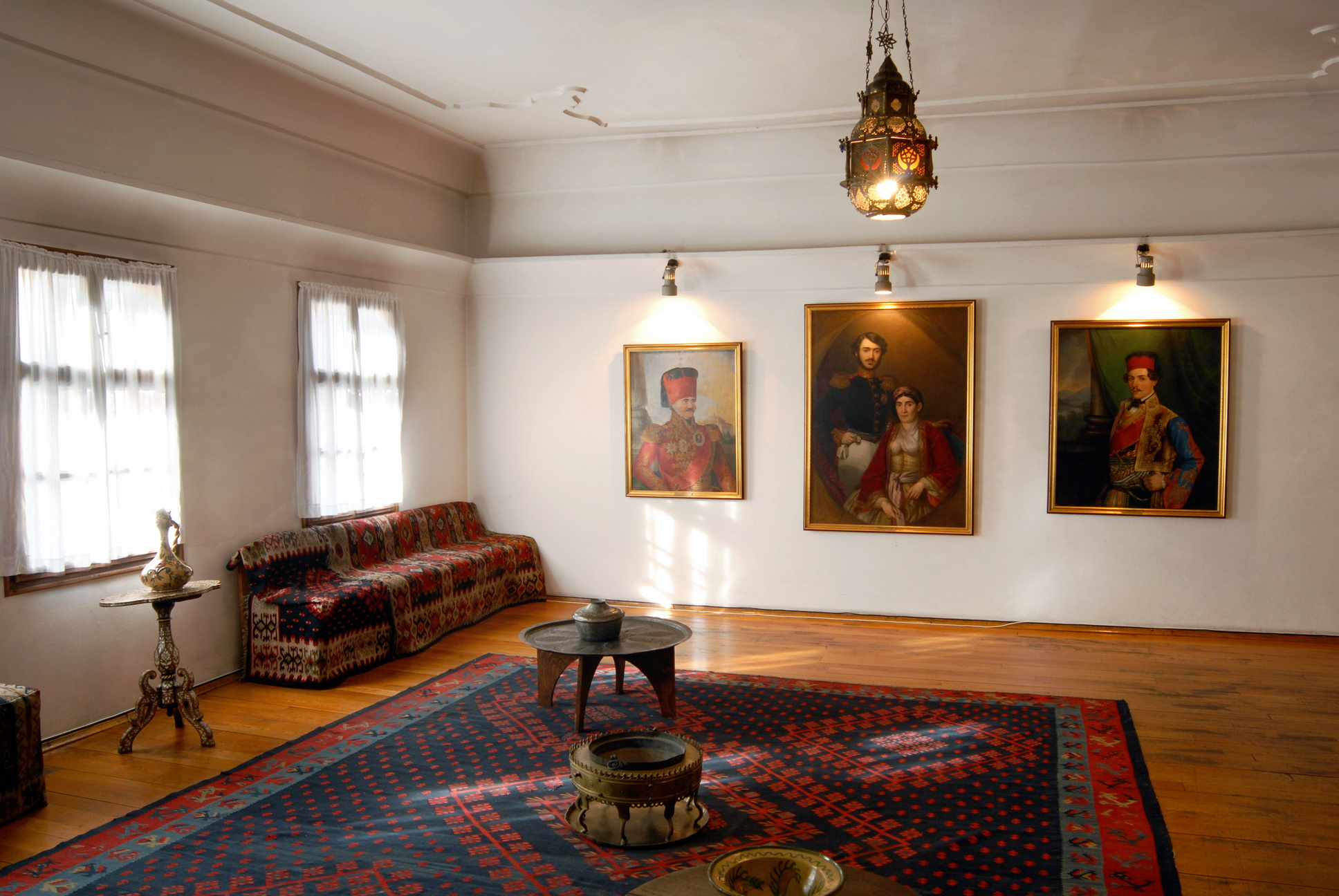

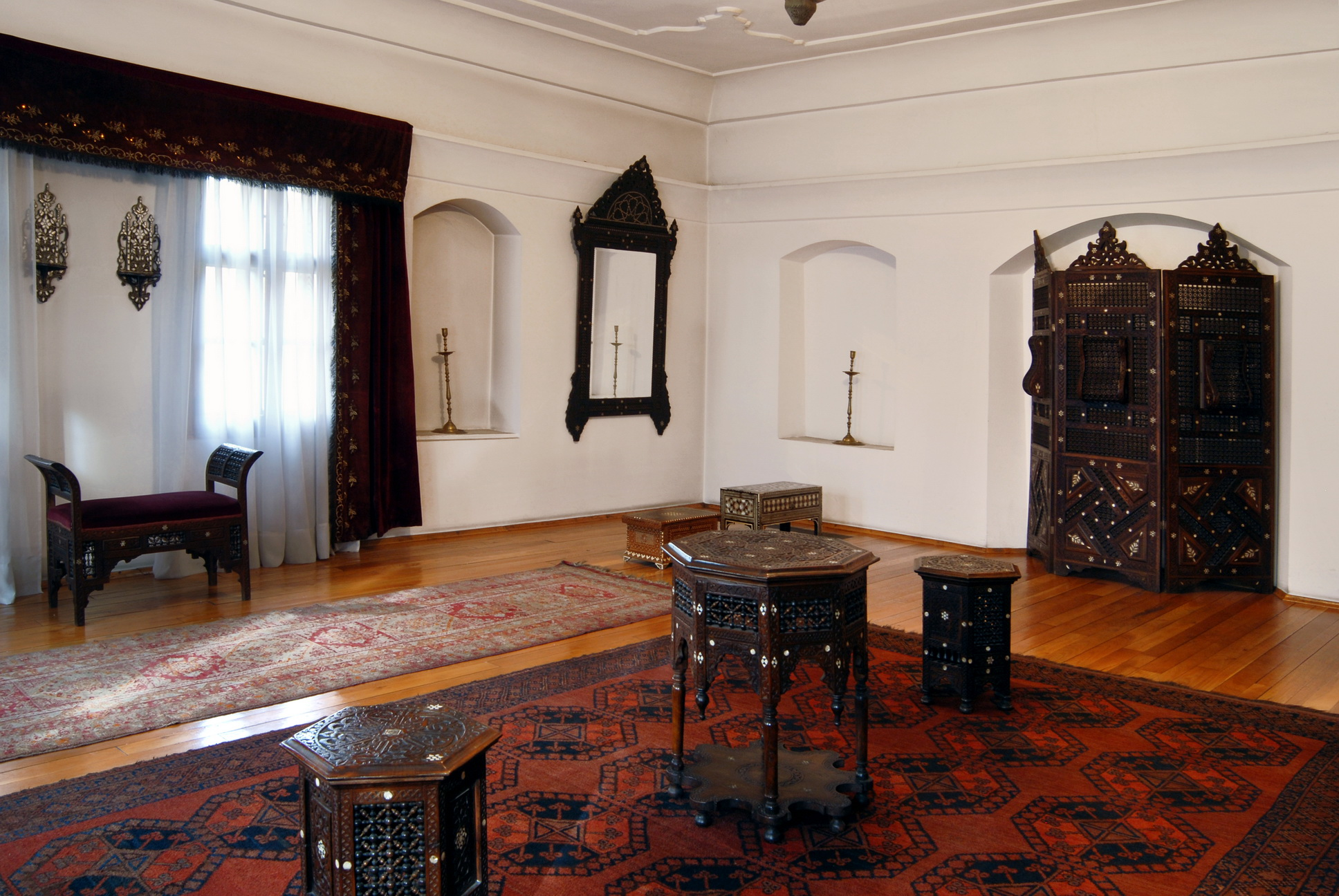

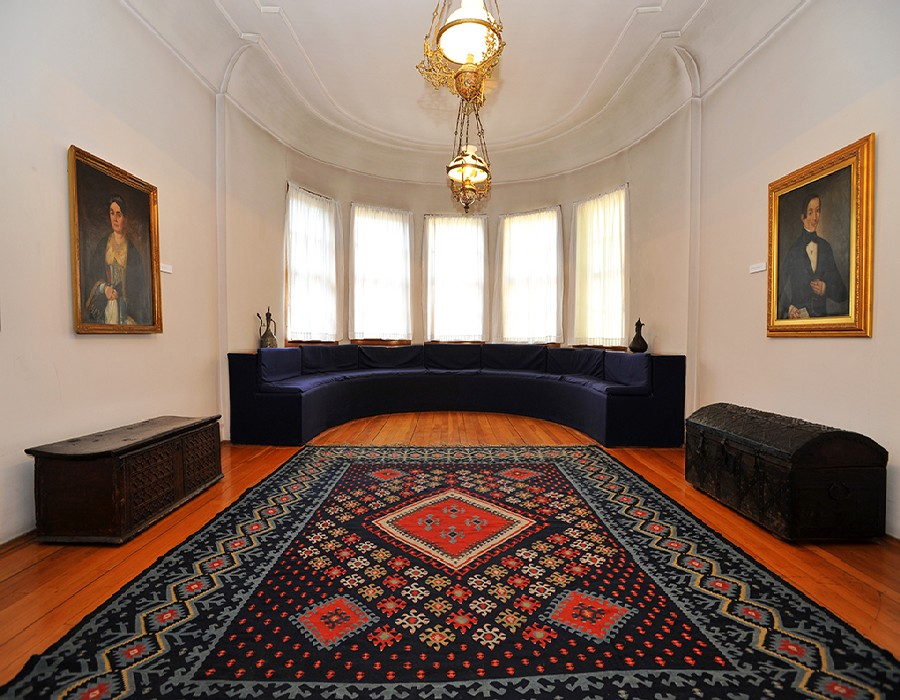

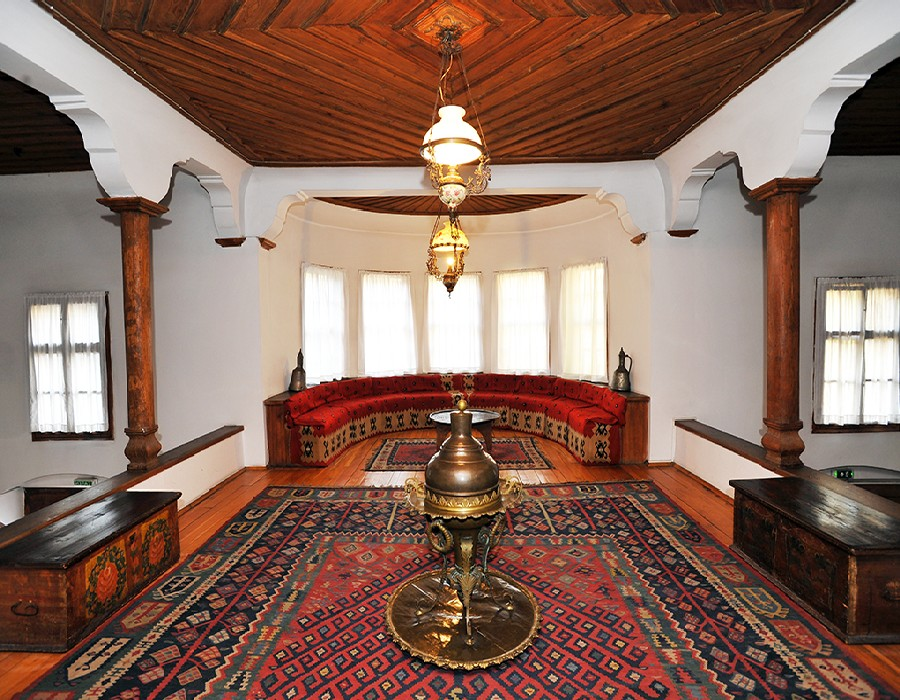

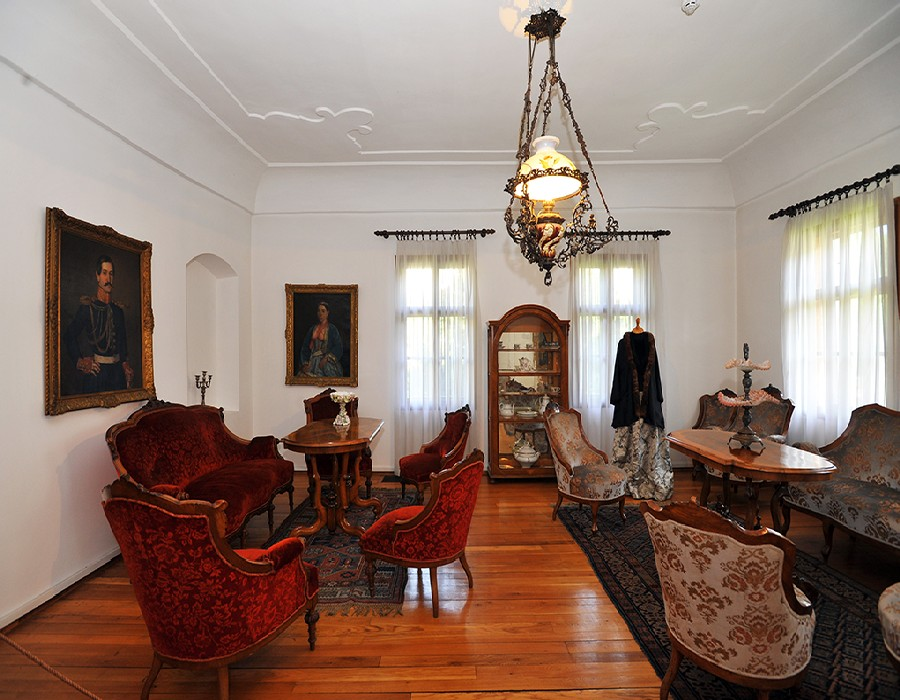

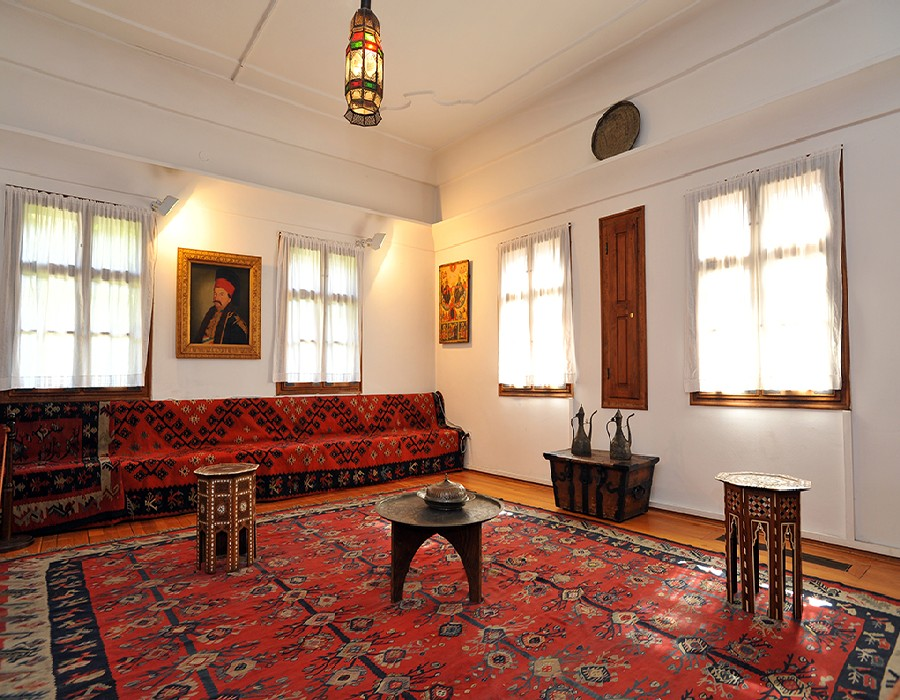

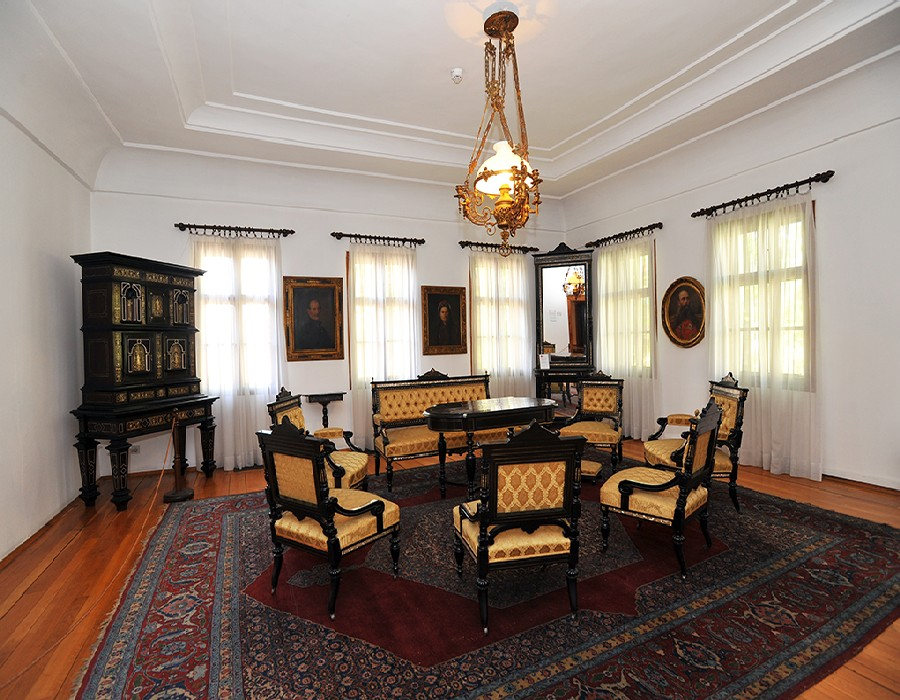

== See also ==
- Residence of Prince Miloš
