= Hadži-Neimar =

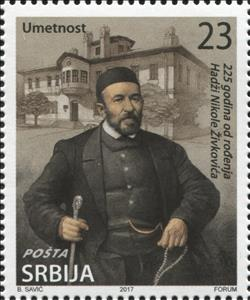
2017 Pošta Srbije stamp featuring Hadži-Neimar Živković

Nikola Živković (Serbian Cyrillic: Никола Живковић; 1792–1870), known as Hadži-Neimar (Хаџи-Неимар), was the chief builder during the first reign of Serbian Prince Miloš Obrenović (1817–39). Born in Voden (now Edessa, Greece) in 1792, he likely was schooled in Thessaloniki or Athens, where he had relatives. It is unknown when he moved to Serbia. His wife, Kostadinka Karkaljer, was from Magarevo (now North Macedonia). He had four daughters and a son. He died at Belgrade in 1870.

A construction worker and contractor by trade, he became Obrenović's chief builder, entrusted with building all governmental- and royal buildings between 1820 and 1850. He is sometimes called an architect, although it remains unknown if there was an actual architect behind the works. The most notable buildings are Princess Ljubica's Residence and Residence of Prince Miloš.
