= Residence of Prince Miloš =

Palace in Belgrade, Serbia

Prince Miloš's Residence
- Конак кнеза Милоша
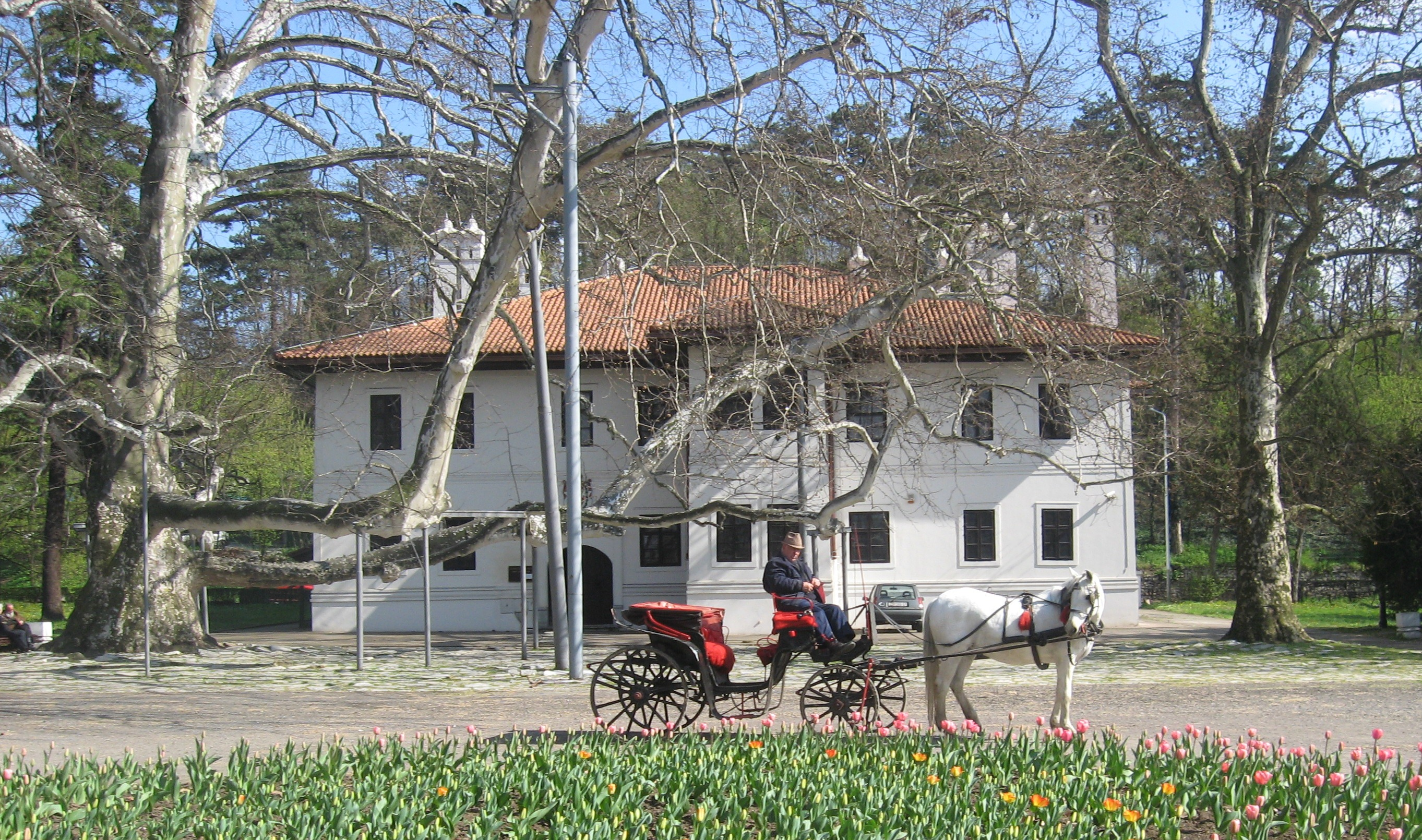
- Old platanus in front of the palace

General information
- Location: Belgrade, Serbia
- Current tenants: Museum of the First Serbian Uprising
- Construction started: 1831
- Inaugurated: 1833

Design and construction
- Architects: Janja Mihajlović, Nikola Đorđević, Hadži Nikola Živković

Cultural Heritage of Serbia
- Official name: Complex of the Residence of Prince Miloš
- Type: Cultural Monument of Exceptional Importance
- Designated: 2 December 1946
- Reference no.: SK 5

The Residence of Prince Miloš (Serbian: Конак кнеза Милоша, romanized: Konak kneza Miloša) is a museum and a former princely residence in the Topčider neighborhood of Belgrade, Serbia.

== History ==
Built in 1831, after Serbia was given autonomous status within the Ottoman Empire, it was originally used as the palace of Prince Miloš Obrenović. During his first reign (1815–1839), Prince Miloš only occasionally visited the palace. After his return to power in Serbia, he stayed and lived here until his death in 1860.

Later, between the two world wars, the building housed the Museum of Hunting and Forestry. In 1954, on the 150th anniversary of the First Serbian Uprising, the building was opened as the Museum of the First Serbian Uprising. The museum, dedicated to the entire period of Serbian resistance to Ottoman rule known as the Serbian Revolution, initially served as the basis for the Historical Museum of Serbia, founded in 1963. In 1979, the Residence of Prince Miloš was declared a Monument of Culture of Exceptional Importance, placing it under the protection of the Serbian state.

== Architecture ==
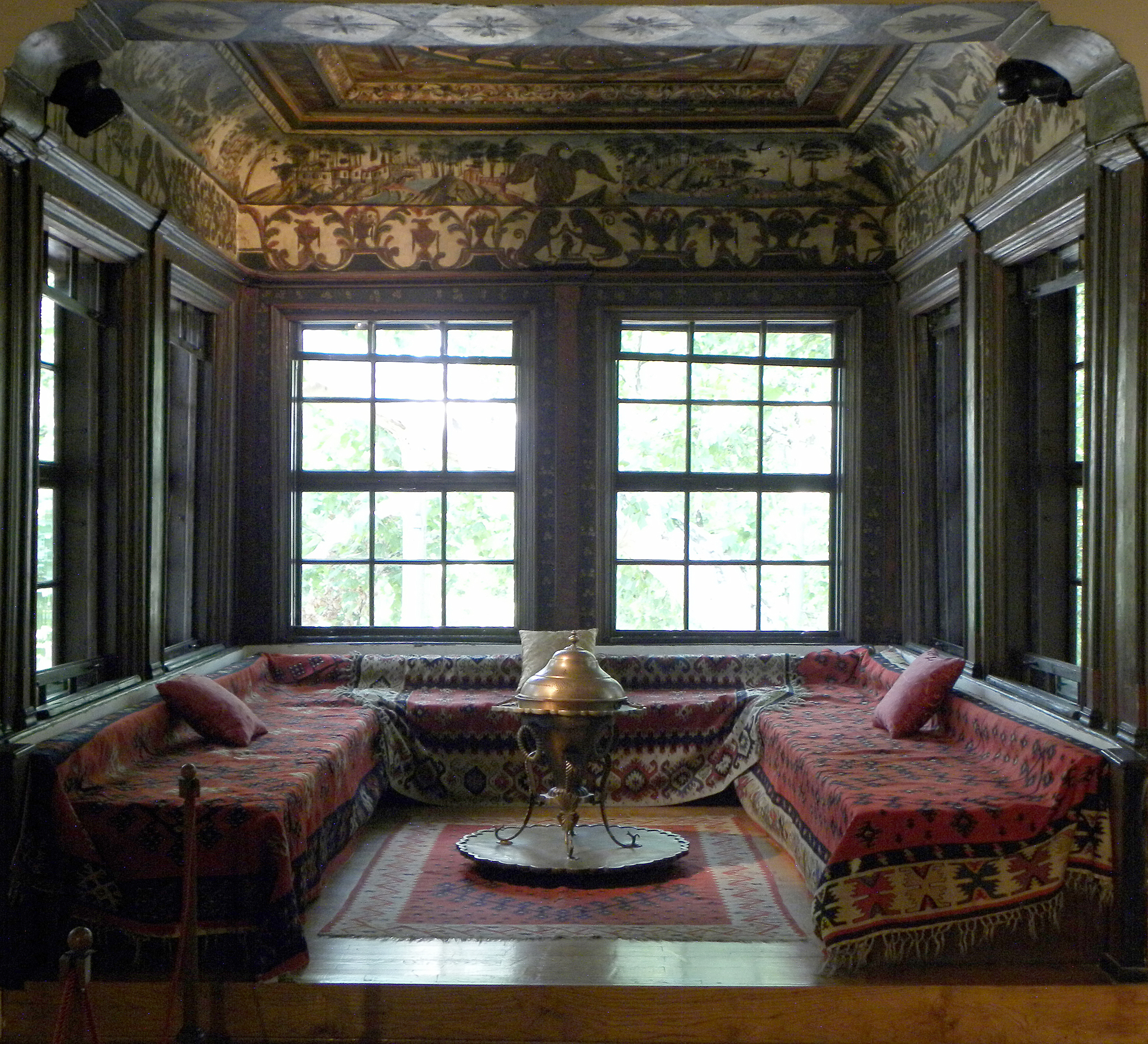
Interior

The palace was designed by architects Janja Mihailović and Nikola Đorđević and the construction was supervised by Hadži Nikola Živković, the primary builder in service of Prince Miloš. Some of their rich interior decoration of the building's ceilings, walls, and niches has been partially preserved to this day. The grounds include a plane tree that is at least 160 years old, one of the oldest in Europe.

== See also ==
- Residence of Princess Ljubica
- List of museums in Serbia
