= Museum of Paja Jovanović =

Museum in Belgrade, Serbia

- Музеј Паје Јовановића; Muzej Paje Jovanovića
- Location within Belgrade
- Location: Belgrade, Serbia
- Coordinates: 44.8074343°N 20.4634796°E
- Website: www.mgb.org.rs/visit/details/6

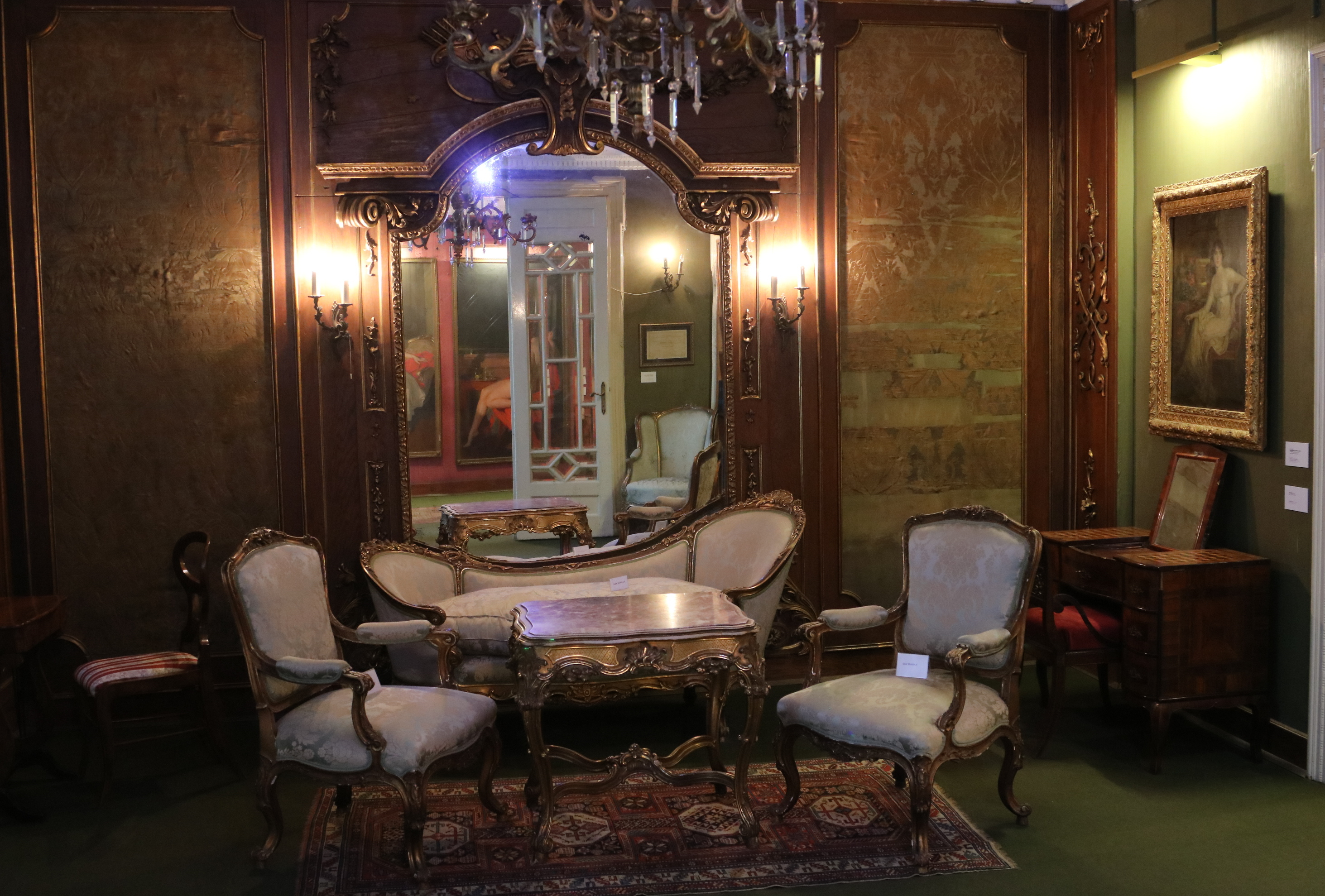
Museum of Paja Jovanović in Belgrade

The Museum of Paja Jovanović is a memorial museum located in Belgrade, the capital of Serbia. The museum contains the paintings and personal object of one of the most famous Serbian painters, Paja Jovanović. The collection represents an exceptional fund of 211 works by Paja Jovanović created during several decades of the 19th and 20th centuries, while the legacy itself has a total of 657 objects.

== History ==
It is not known when Paja Jovanović (Vršac, 1859 – Vienna, 1957) first visited Belgrade. It is reasonable to guess that it might have happened during his visits to the hometown, Vršac, or on his travels to the southern parts of Serbia in the closing decades of the 19th century. Although he never spent much time in Belgrade due to his painting commitments all over the globe, it remained a place to which he eagerly returned. After the plan to build an art studio for him in Belgrade had been abandoned with the break-out of World War II, in 1950, Paja Jovanović started a correspondence with the officials of the Belgrade City Museum about establishing his legacy in Belgrade. He wanted to bequeath to the City the pieces of his work and items of his painting equipment that he considered “worth preserving”, so that a studio could be set up – the master’s room attracting those who would like to learn something more about him and his art.

The legacy of Paja Jovanović, including more than 800 objects, was handed over to the Belgrade City Museum in 1952. In compliance with the artist’s wish, after his death in Vienna on 30 November 1957, the urn with his remains was also delivered to the museum. Just as he wished, it was buried at the Alley of Distinguished Citizens in Belgrade's New Cemetery on 11 June 1970, on the same day when the Belgrade City Museum fulfilled the painter’s second wish by opening to public the Museum of Paja Jovanović.

In 1972, the collection was extended by the gift of the painter’s wife Hermina – Möuny Dauber. She bequeathed to the Belgrade City Museum eleven paintings by Paja Jovanović from her private collection and a number of pieces of antique furniture.

In 2009, on the occasion of 150 years since the birth of Paja Jovanović, the Museum was reconstructed and the paintings and furniture were conserved and restored.

== See also ==
- List of museums in Serbia
