= Museum of Ivo Andrić =

- Музеј Иве Андрића; Muzej Ive Andrića

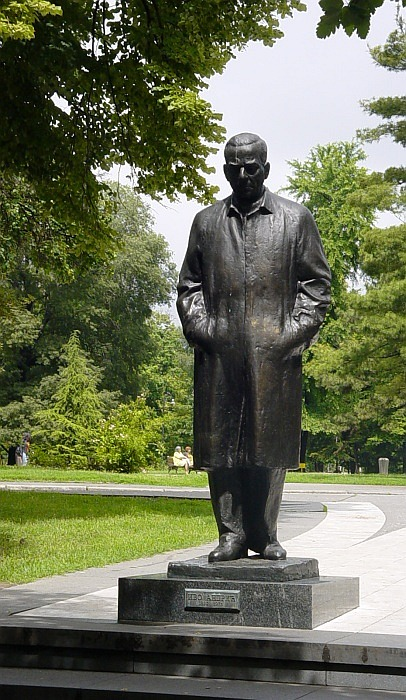
- Ivo Andrić monument in front of the museum
- Established: 10 October 1976; 50 years ago
- Location: Andrićev Venac 8, Belgrade, Serbia
- Coordinates: 44.8096°N 20.4637°E
- Type: Historic house museum
- Director: Miroslav Pantić
- Website: www.ivoandric.org.rs

The Museum of Ivo Andrić (Serbian: Музеј Иве Андрића / Muzej Ive Andrića) is a museum located in Belgrade, the capital of Serbia. Founded on 10 October 1976, it is dedicated to the Nobel prize winning writer Ivo Andrić. It is operated by the Belgrade City Museum.

The library contains 4,502 bibliographical units, rich collection of photographs, numerous Andrić's personal holdings, and writer's study room and the salon, with authentic atmosphere since Andrić's time. There are also exhibits of his documents (such as university student's booklet and diplomatic passport) and awards, including the Nobel Prize medal and plaque.

== History ==
The Museum was founded on 10 October 1976 under the decree of the Ministry for Science and Culture of Serbia. It is located in apartment where Ivo Andrić lived with his wife Milica Babić from 1958 until death.

== Gallery ==
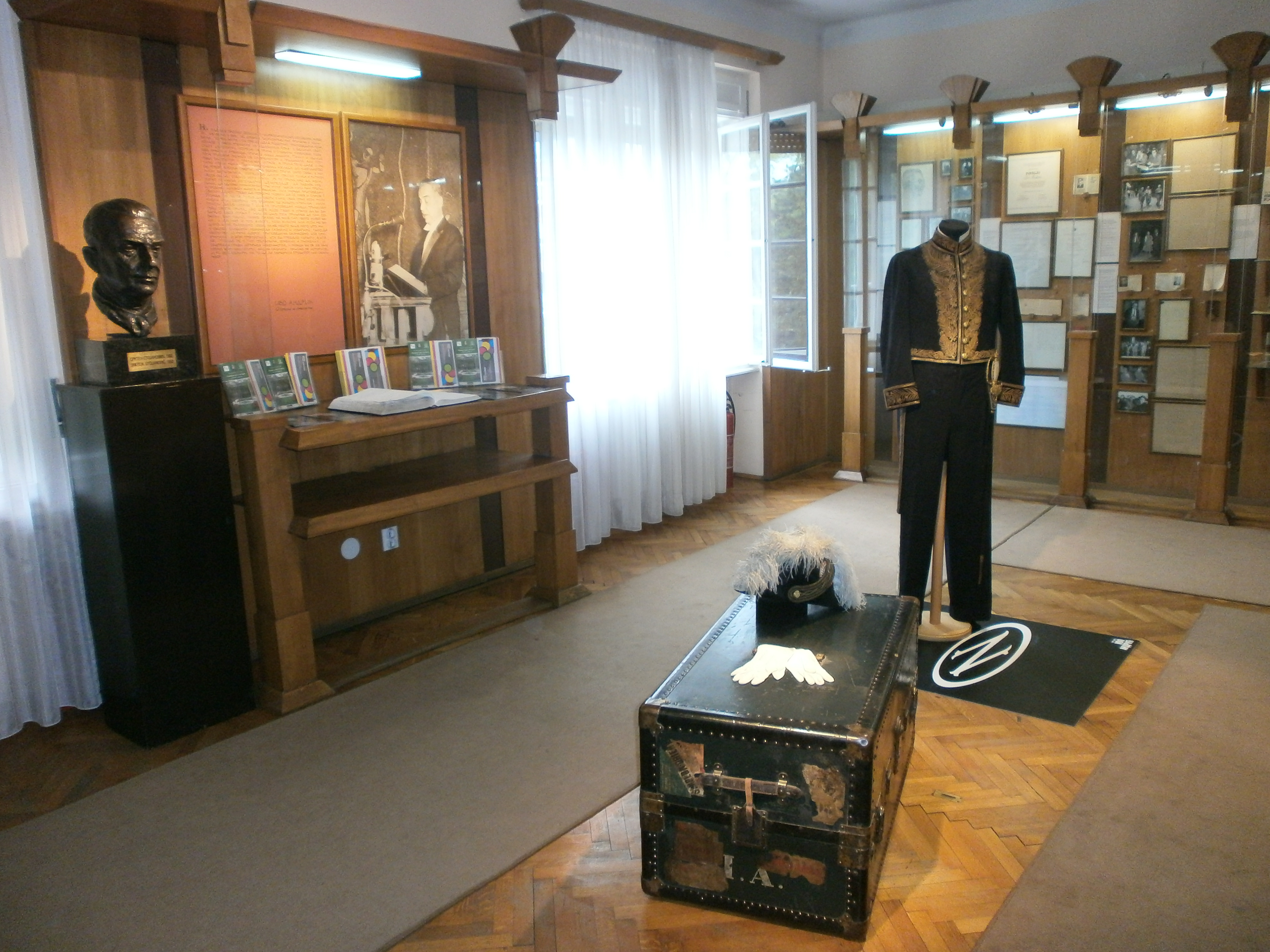

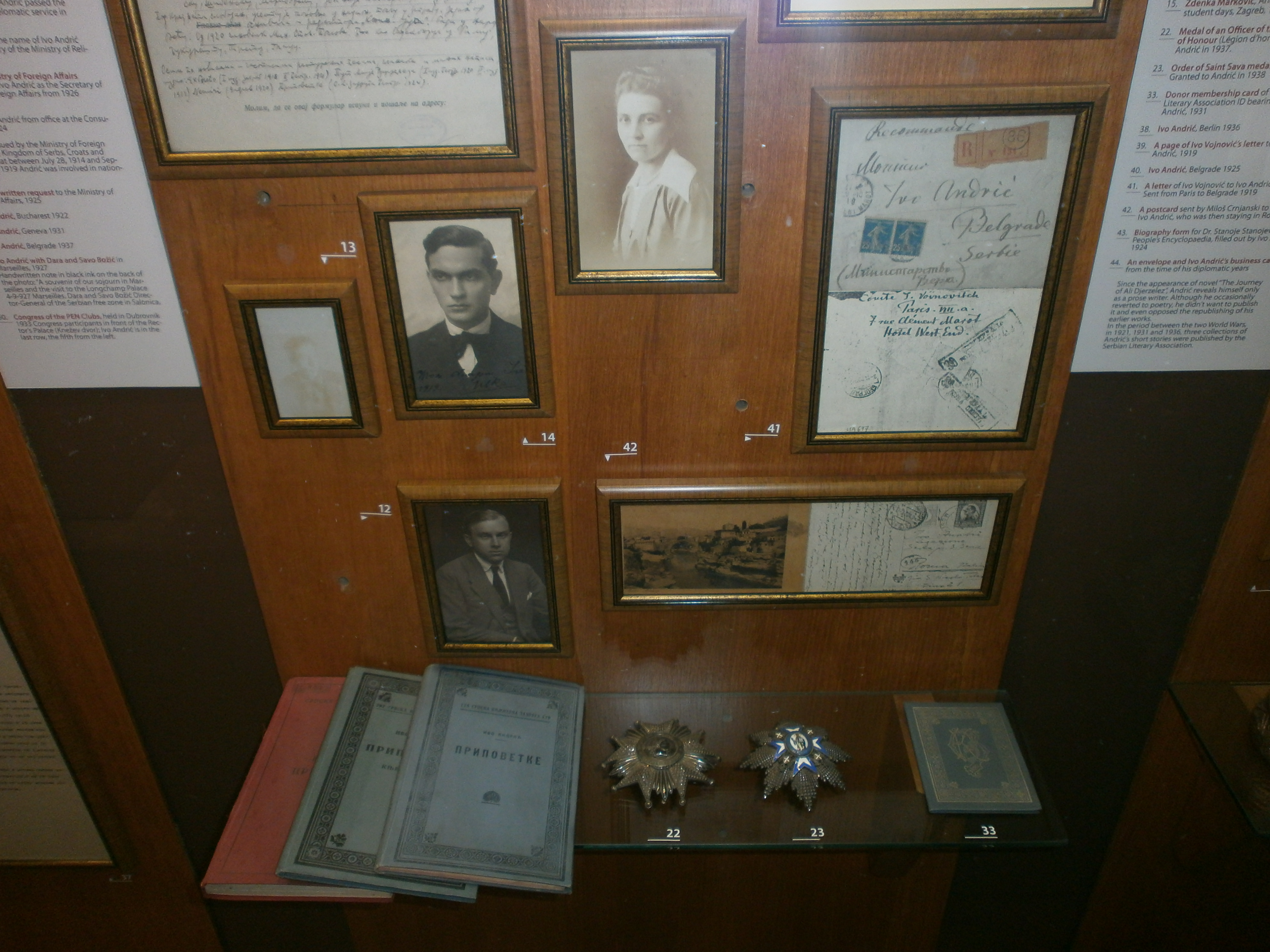

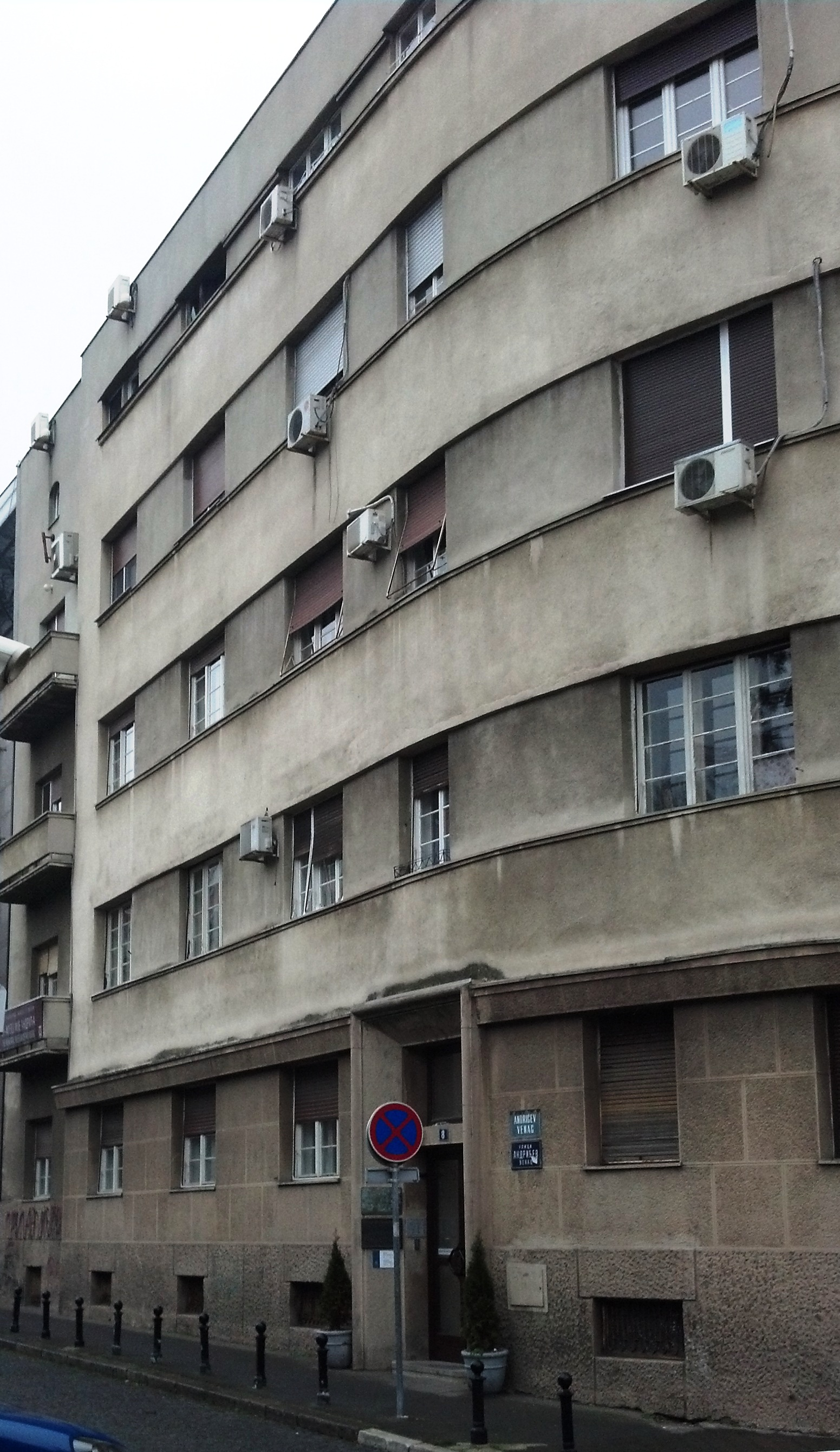

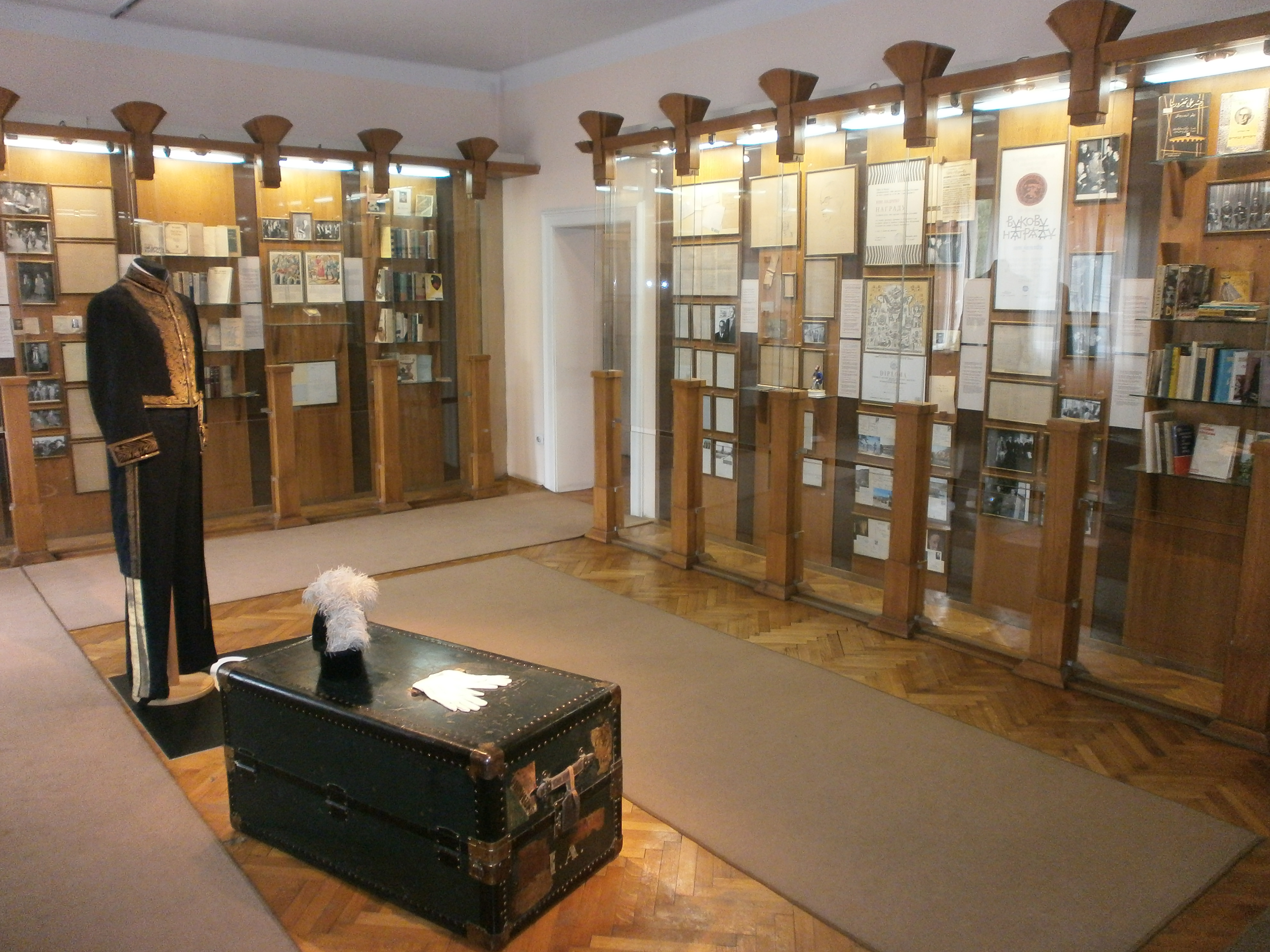

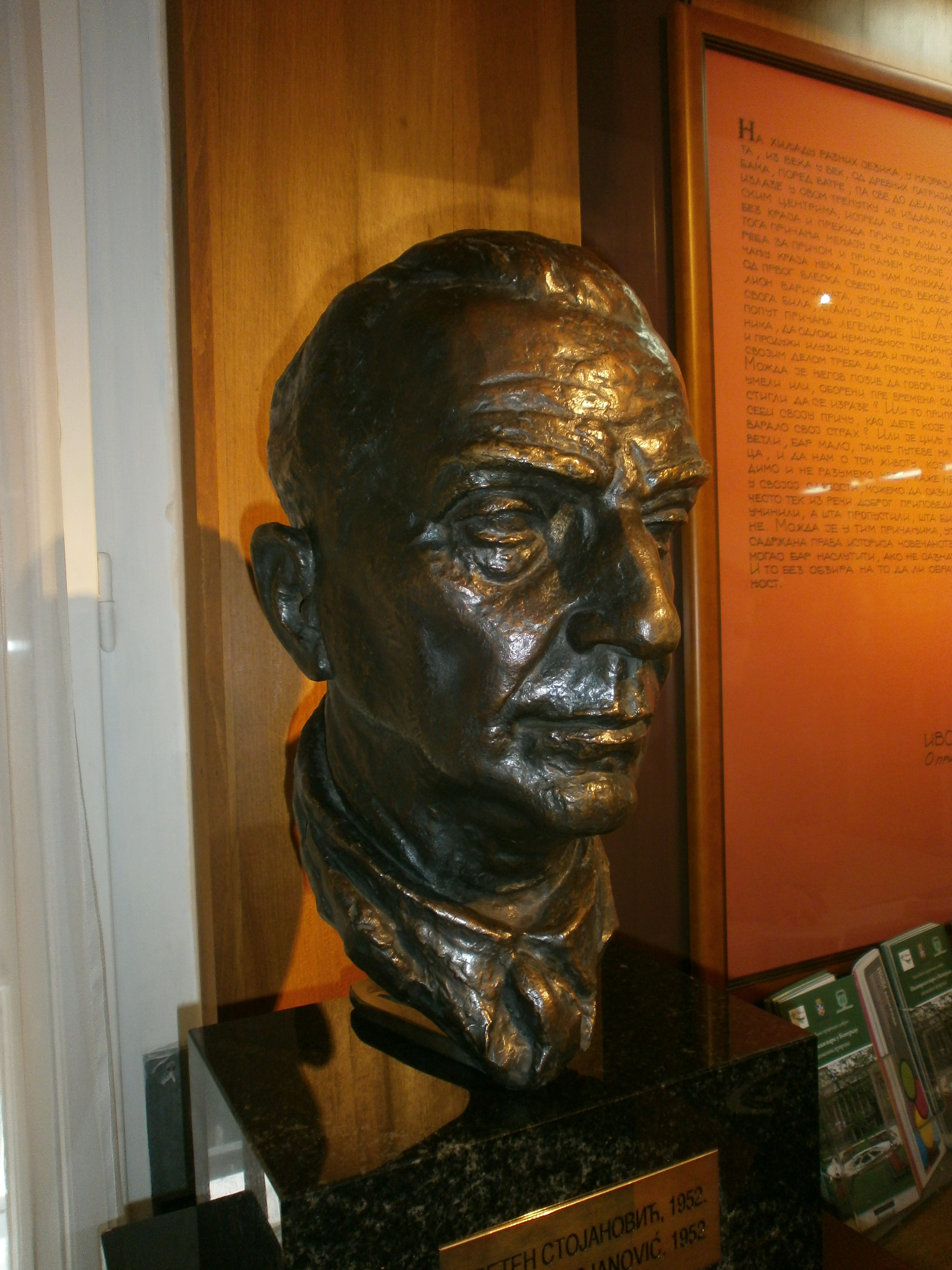

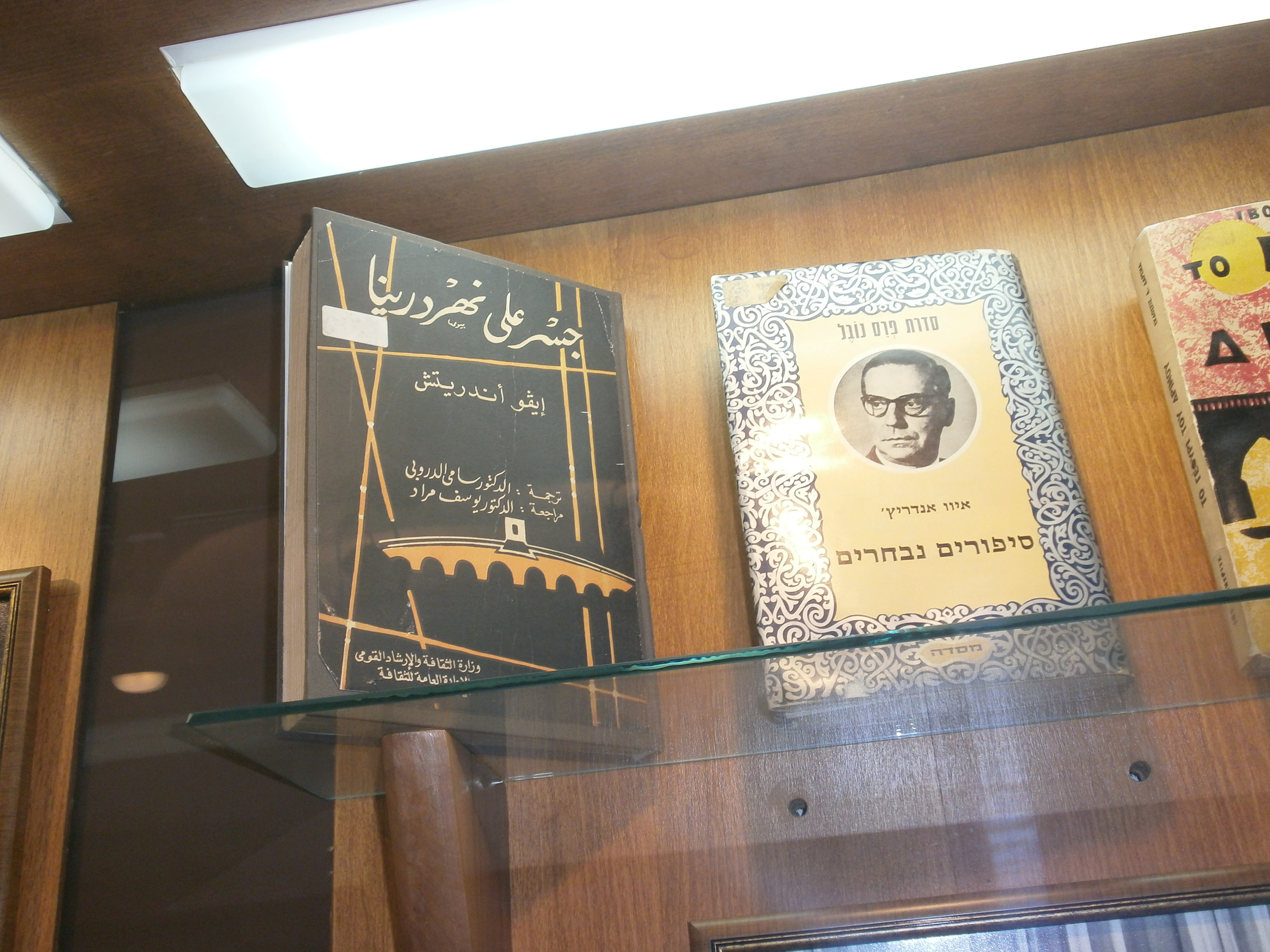

== See also ==
- Tourism in Serbia
- List of museums in Serbia
