= Nikola Đorđević (architect) =

Serbian architect

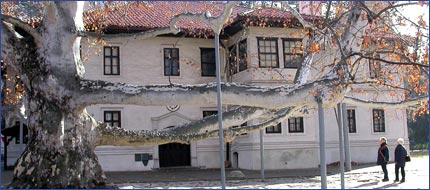
The Konak of Prince Miloš in Belgrade

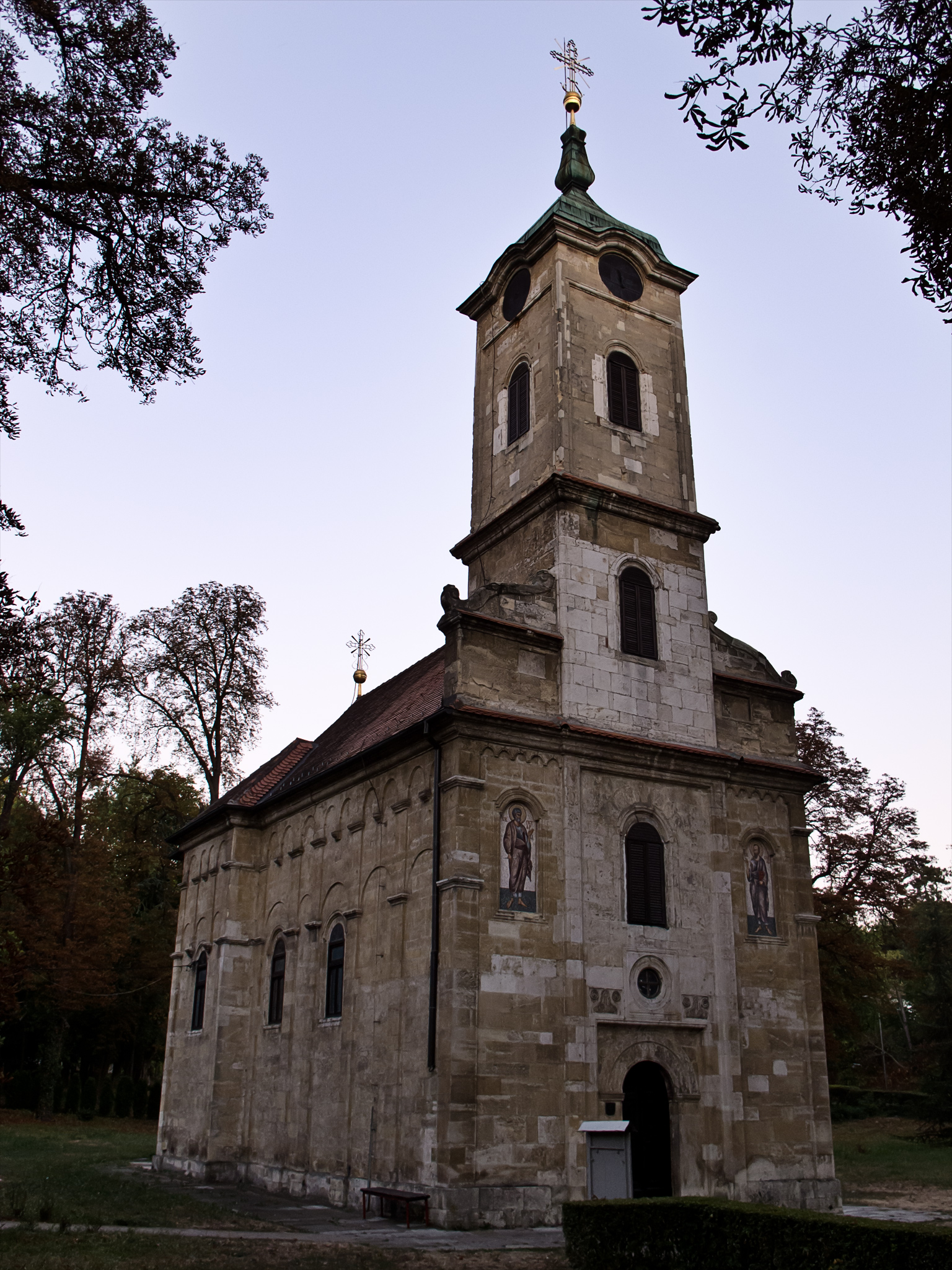
Church of the Holy Apostles Peter and Paul in Topčider

Nikola Đorđević (in Cyrillic Serbian: Никола Ђорђевић) was a Serbian architect who lived and worked at the beginning of the 19th century. His work is characteristic of the architectural tradition of that time, between traditional contributions and openings with Western influences.

== Works ==
His two best-known works are the Konak of Prince Miloš Obrenović in Belgrade, in the Topčider district, built between 1831 and 1833 2 and the Church of the Holy Apostles Peter and Paul in Topčider, built between 1832 and 1834, which mixes influences traditional and references to western architecture (classical and baroque). These two works are respectively classified on the list of exceptional monuments and on the list of protected monuments of the Republic of Serbia.

These two buildings were produced in collaboration with the architect Janja Mihailović.
