= Belgrade City Museum =

Museum in Belgrade, Serbia

- Музеј Града Београда

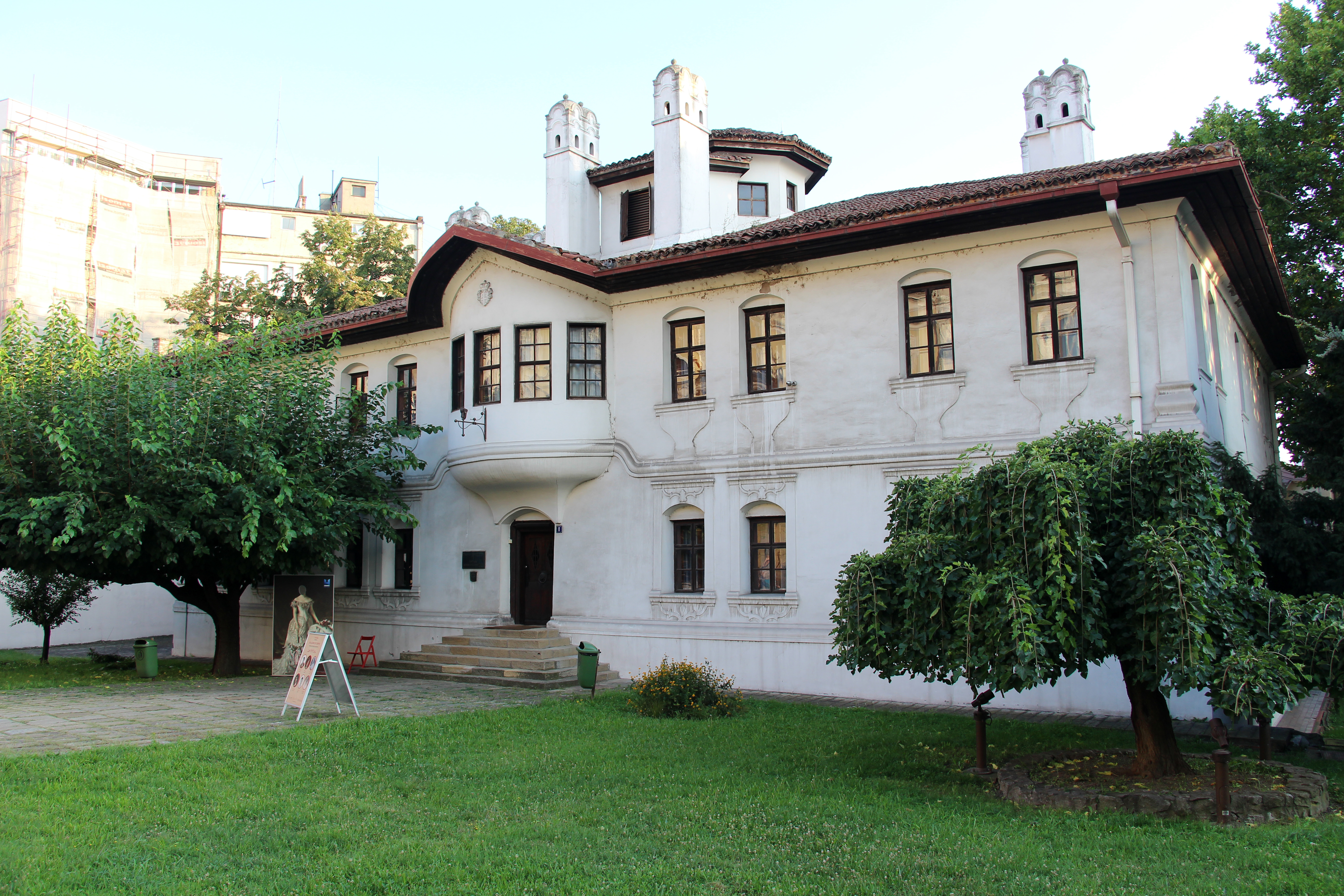
- Countess Ljubica's Residence in 2018
- Established: 1903; 123 years ago
- Location: Belgrade, Serbia
- Coordinates: 44.804198°N 20.461199°E
- Director: Jelena Medaković
- Website: www.mgb.org.rs

The Belgrade City Museum (Serbian Cyrillic: Музеј Града Београда, Muzej Grada Beograda) is a museum located in Belgrade, Serbia. Founded in 1903, the museum operates with several cultural institutions: Ivo Andrić Museum, Princess Ljubica's Residence, Paja Jovanović Museum, Jovan Cvijić Museum, Banjica Concentration Camp Museum, Collection of Icons Sekulić, Archaeological Site Vinča and Zemun Museum.

The Belgrade City Museum contains over 2,500 paintings, graphics, aquarelles and drawings. It contains numerous paintings by Serbian painters Paja Jovanović, Sava Šumanović, Uroš Predić, Nadežda Petrović, Petar Lubarda and others. Among others, it contains paintings and graphics by foreign artists Albrecht Dürer, Miklós Barabás and Jean-Baptiste-Camille Corot.

== Collections ==
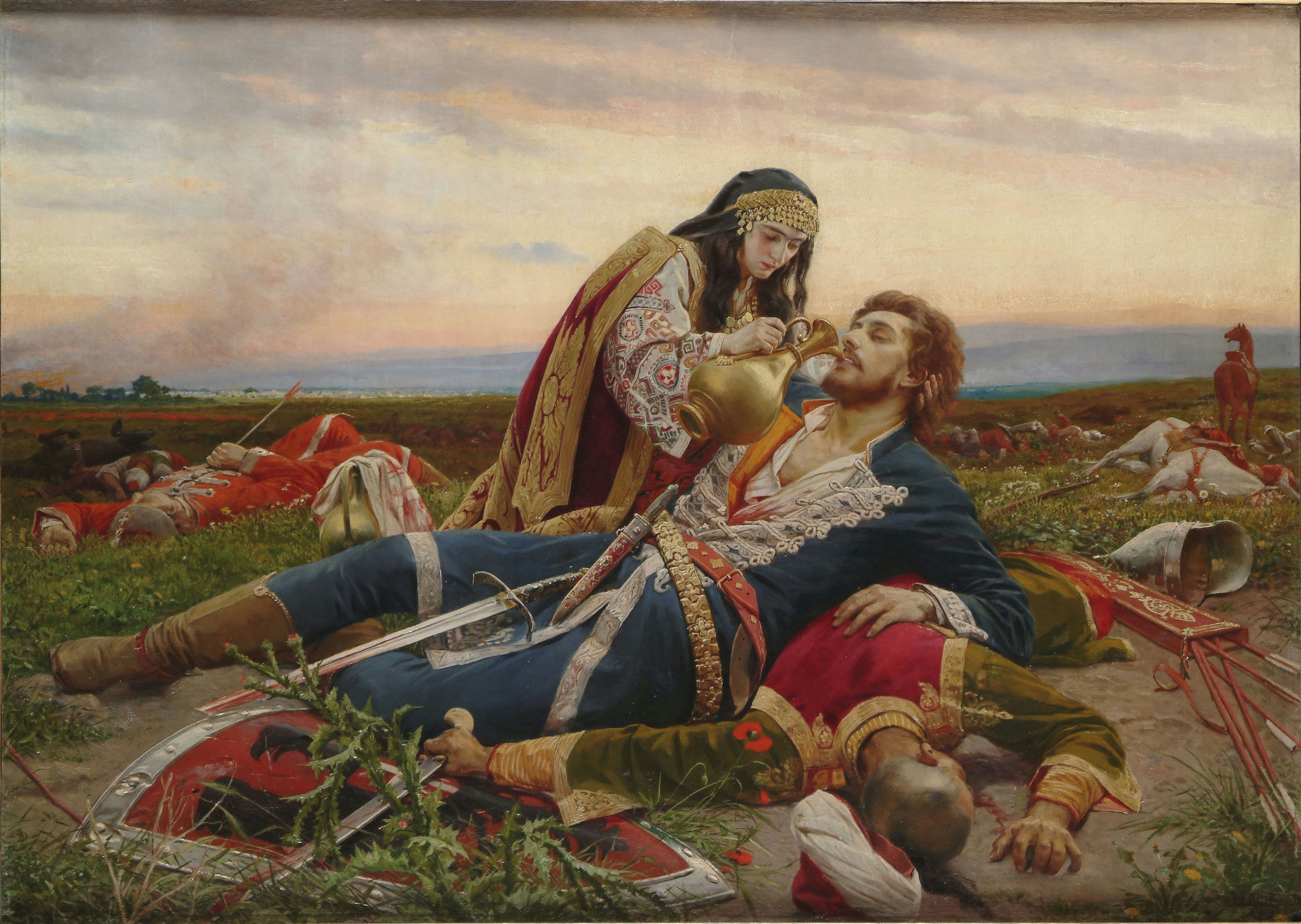
Kosovo Maiden, by Uroš Predić

The Belgrade City Museum collections are:

- Prehistory
- Antique
- Middle Ages
- Coins and Medals
- Archaeological site Vinca
- History of Belgrade 1521–1941
- History of Belgrade since 1941
- Fine Arts and Music before 1950
- Fine Arts and Music after 1950
- Applied Arts and Ethnology
- Education and Science
- Culture and Literature
- Urban Planning and Architecture

The museum also operates an outpost in, and documenting, the former Banjica concentration camp.

== New building ==
By the 2010s, the museum amassed a collection of 200,000 pieces, but had no permanent exhibition space of its own. The exhibits were kept at 16 different locations. In September 2022, a Belgrade City Museum's Salon was opened at 30 Bulevar kralja Aleksandra. Museum space occupies two levels, and exhibits Serbian works of art created after 1950.

City awarded the former military building at the corner of Resavska ad Nemanjina streets, and the adjoining lot, for the future location of the Belgrade City Museum. Known as the Military Academy Building, it was built in 1899 and designed by Dimitrije T. Leko. It leans on the Building of the General Staff, which was built in 1965. Massive reconstruction and adaptation into the museum, after the project of Jelena Vojvodić, Goran Vojvodić and Jovana Grujevska, was tentatively announced in 2016. Total floor area of the museum will cover 17,000 m^{2} (180,000 sq ft). Part of the building will be preserved while other parts will be upgraded and modernized. The entry staircase and portal were demolished, in order to make the inner space higher. The inner yard will be restored and the exhibition rooms, depot, conservation area, library, workshops, archaeological lapidarium and amphitheater will be formed. Frontal outer walls, at the corner itself, will be adapted into the media façades.

Left wing will be adapted into the permanent exhibition space. Right wing will host administration, library, workshops and conservation sector. Depots will be arranged on each floor and in the entire basement. In 2018 the first phase of the complete reconstruction of the building was announced. In May 2020, works were postponed to 2021. Starting in the spring of 2021, the works should be finished by 2024 when the museum should become the largest one in Belgrade. However, the first tender for selecting the contractor from 2021 failed, so as a repeated one in September 2022. Former because the only applicant failed to meet the tender's conditions, latter because no one wanted to work for the amount offered by the city. Works were accordingly postponed for 2023, with completion in 2024. Mayor Aleksandar Šapić announced in September 2022 that works will start by the end of 2022, and be finished in 2025.

== See also ==
- National Museum of Serbia
- White Palace
- List of museums in Serbia
