= Ivanka Raspopović =

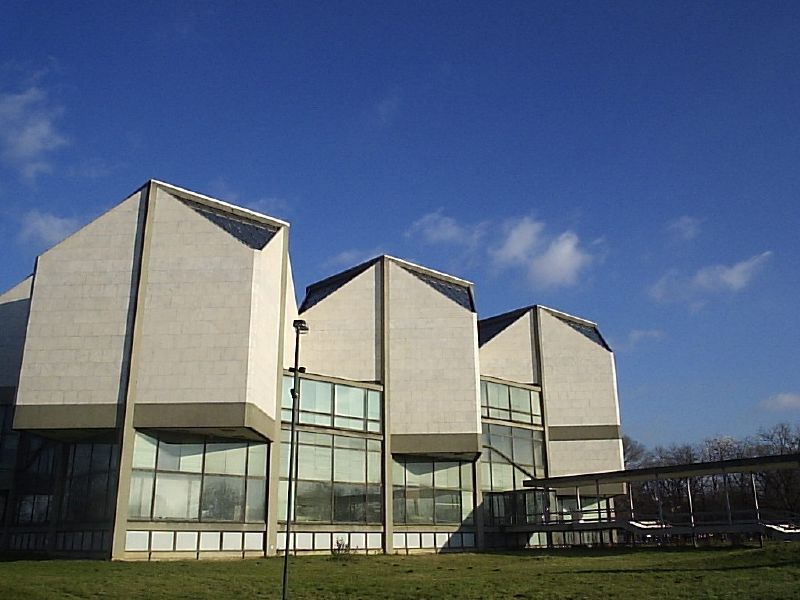
- Museum of Contemporary Art, Belgrade
- Born: 1930; Belgrade, SR Serbia
- Died: 8 June 2015 (aged 84–85)
- Occupation: Architect
- Known for: Socialist Modernist architecture
- Notable work: Museum of Contemporary Art, 21 October Museum

Ivanka Raspopović (Serbian Cyrillic: Иванка Распоповић; 1930–2015) was a Serbian Modernist architect known for designing Belgrade's "Museum of Contemporary Art" and Kragujevac's "21 October Museum".

== Career ==
In 1954, Raspopović was hired by the Rad construction company, where her husband Dragan Raspopović was also employed. One of her projects involved a textile factory in Loznica. She worked closely with the company's civil engineers to build the facility.

In 1955, she left Rad to work for the Srbijaprojekt construction firm, where she stayed until 1960. Raspopović built the second phase of the Belgrade Airport and was the lead designer of an entire complex of factories in Jagodina (then known as Svetozarevo). She also constructed a workers' dining facility in Obrenovac, a tuberculosis hospital in Prizren, a cold storage facility near Tetovo, and a department store in Bečej. Additionally she co-designed an industrial complex in Priboj with architect Slobodan Mihajlović.

From 1961 until 1964, Raspopović worked for the Zlatibor company, where she often collaborated with architect Stanko Mandić. She built two transmitter stations for the city of Zlatibor. She also was behind several constructions in Užice, such as a residential building, a general hospital, and the headquarters for an electricity distribution company.

In 1960, Raspopović collaborated with Ivan Antic to design Belgrade‘s Museum of Contemporary Art, which took five years to build. Composed of 6 cubes creating a crystal like shape, the structure's facade was covered with white marble panels which straddled large windows. Five exhibition halls, of varying heights, allowed the lower levels to be viewed from higher up, at multiple vantage points. Regarded as a national work of art, the museum embodied "...the aesthetic staples of modernism: formal simplicity, transparency, and structural honesty". By linking its interior with the exterior space, the structure displayed an original architectural concept for that time.

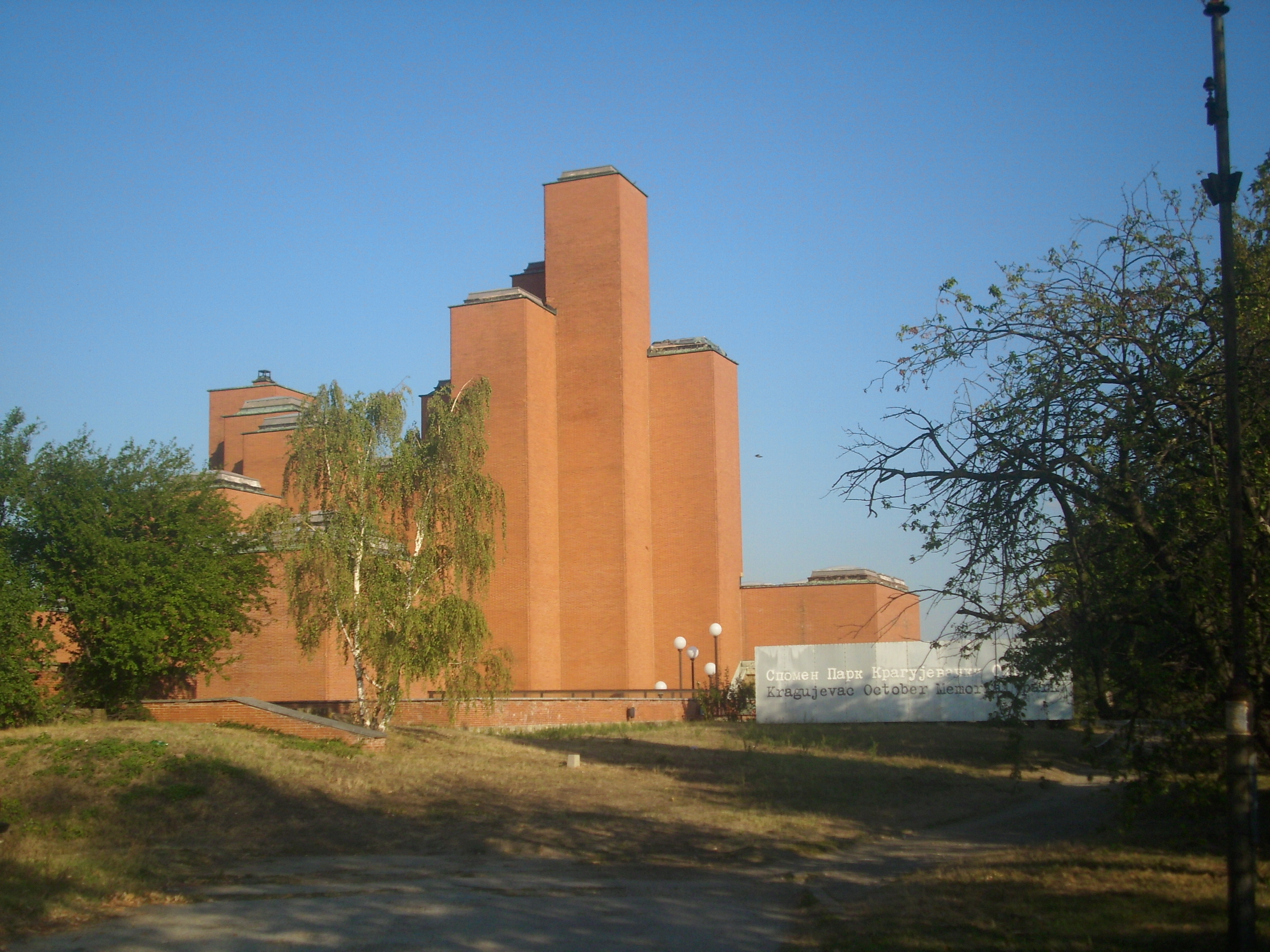
21 October Museum, Kragujevac

In 1967, Raspopović and Antić were asked to build the "21 October Museum", located in the Šumarice Memorial Park in Kragujevac. Designed with 33 projecting rectangles of different heights, the facade was covered with specially made exposed bricks. Finally completed in 1976, the museum was dedicated to the casualties of the World War 2 Kragujevac massacre. With no windows in the building’s walls, the interior space felt closed and inverted, representing the hopelessness felt by the victims before they died.

She later returned to work at Srbijaprojekt in 1965 and stayed there until her retirement in 1980. According to Raspopović, the majority of architects at Srbijaprojekt were women.

Raspopović was a member of the Serbian Academy of Architecture.

== Awards and distinctions ==
Described as a striking example of modernist architecture by the BBC, the "Museum of Contemporary Art" won Raspopović and Antić an "October Prize" in 1965, awarded to them by the City of Belgrade. In 1987, the building was declared a national monument and listed as a heritage site, as was the "21 October Museum".

Raspopović's work was discussed in the 1972 book "Yugoslav Art of the 20th Century: Serbian Architecture 1900-1970." In 2015, she was mentioned in another compilation entitled "Women in Architecture: Contemporary architecture in Serbia since 1900". In 2018, Raspopović was also recognized in a volume about European women architects, which was published by the European Union. The book is called "MoMoWo – 100 papers in 100 years: European Women in Architecture and Design (1918–2018)". Also in 2018, Raspopović's experiences as a female architect were the subject of a conference organised by Belgrade International Architecture Week (BINA).

== Background ==
Born in Belgrade, Raspopović studied architecture at the University of Belgrade and graduated in 1954. She gave her full support during the renovations of the Museum of Contemporary Art which lasted from 2007 to 2017. She died on 8 June 2015.
