= Museum of Contemporary Art, Belgrade =

Art museum in Belgrade, Serbia

Museum of Contemporary Art
- Музеј савремене уметности Muzej savremene umetnosti

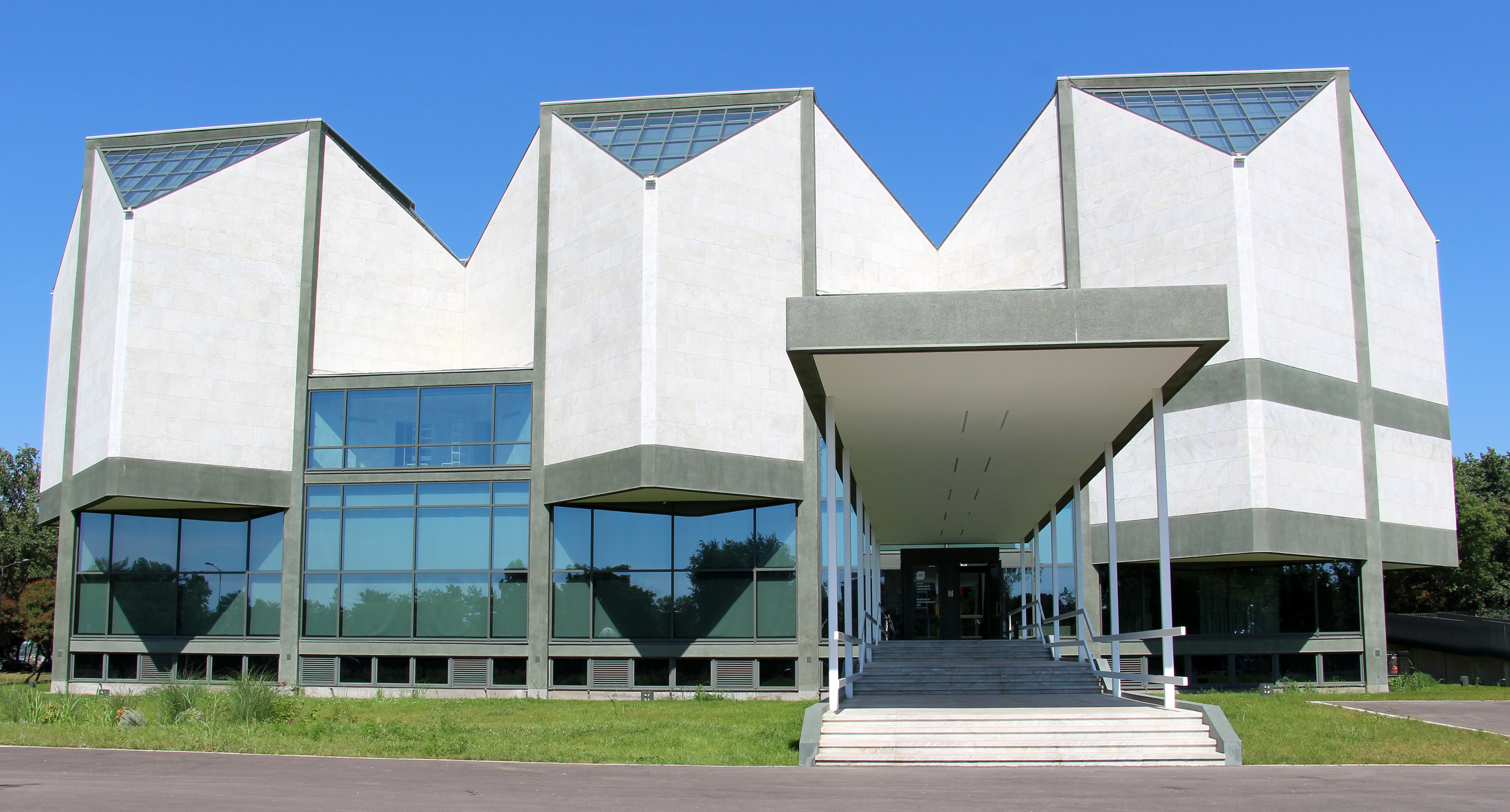
- Established: 1958; 68 years ago
- Location: Belgrade
- Coordinates: 44°49′10″N 20°26′32″E
- Type: Art museum
- Visitors: 98,826 (October 2017 – July 2018)
- Director: Marijana Kolarić
- Curator: Mišela Blanuša
- Website: www.msub.org.rs

The Museum of Contemporary Art (Serbian: Музеј савремене уметности, romanized: Muzej savremene umetnosti) is an art museum located in Belgrade, Serbia. It was founded in 1958 as the Modern Gallery, making it one of the first museums of this type in the world. It was moved into the current building in the Ušće neighborhood of New Belgrade in 1965. The building is a masterpiece of architects Ivan Antić and Ivanka Raspopović, a short-lived but highly successful partnership, which also produced the 21 October Museum in Šumarice Memorial Park in Kragujevac. The collection contains more than 35,000 works of art.

The museum collects and displays art works produced since 1900 in Serbia and Yugoslavia. It also organizes international exhibitions of modern and contemporary art.

The museum was closed for renovation between 2007 and 2017. After several deadlines were pushed back, the museum was finally reopened for visitors on 20 October 2017.

== History ==
=== Construction ===
The museum building is located near the confluence of the rivers Sava and Danube, in Ušće park in the Novi Beograd municipality. It was designed by Ivan Antić and Ivanka Raspopović in 1960, with construction beginning that year and continuing until 1965. The architects received the October Prize from the City of Belgrade on 20 October 1965, the same day the museum was opened to the public.

Due to its shape, architecture and location, it has been described as the "crystal at the confluence" or an "(architectural) jewel".

=== 2007–17 renovation ===
When renovation talks first began in the early 2000s, both original architects were still alive. However, Antić died in 2005 and Raspopović in 2015. Reconstruction began in 2007, but dragged on for a decade, due to numerous reasons. After 10 years of renovation work, the museum was finally re-opened to the public on 20 October 2017, on the anniversary of the first museum opening 52 years earlier. The entire building was renovated and upgraded to meet current museum standards. The park surrounding the museum building was also reconstructed. The first exhibition to be held in the newly renovated museum was "Sequences" by Dejan Sretenović.

Raspopović contributed to the reconstruction project by suggesting that the glass, belonging to the building's domes, be replaced with a darker shade. The newly added blue panels change their tone, depending on the weather and time of day. The domes have therefore become interactive and dynamic, complementing the surrounding park and the nearby modernistic glass-and-steel Ušće Tower. The main criticism, regarding the renovations, revolves around the use of too much concrete in the access paths leading to the museum. Despite new lighting, as well as the addition of pebbles and tartan, critics believe that the concrete makes the area appear less "humane" and could hamper the future growth of avenue-like trees along the paths.

The parceling and concrete work done in the surrounding park area was also criticized, as was the apparent haste in the latter stages to finish the reconstruction quickly. The first company chosen to do the construction work was "Montera". It was paid fully for the job, but went bankrupt leaving the renovation unfinished for years. During the next public bidding in 2014, aimed specifically at redoing the roof, the company "Jedinstvo" from Užice was chosen. The following bidding, which covered the remaining work, failed. "Jedinstvo" applied again and was selected by the museum, even though it had the highest offer. The Ministry of Culture, headed by Ivan Tasovac at the time, insisted that the lowest bidder should be picked instead, which was "Modulor", a company from Zemun. As a result, the museum director, Jovan Despotović, was let go and the "Termoinženjering" company was chosen at the next bidding. They finished the entire reconstruction, renovating the roof a second time. Yet, already in July 2018 the reconstructed roof began to leak when it rained.

== Departments ==
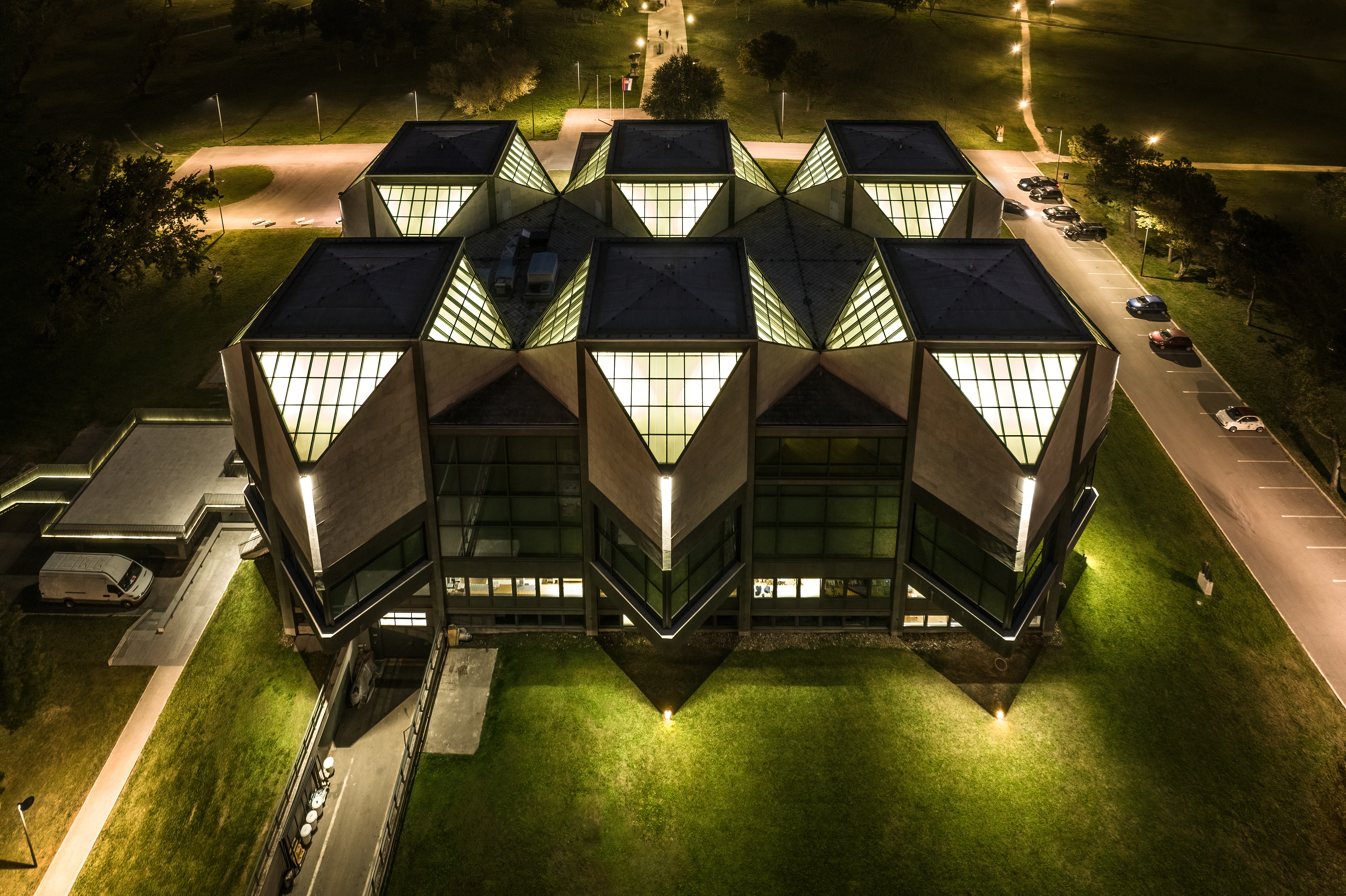
Museum of contemporary art by night

The collection began to form in 1958. As of 2018, 8,000 paintings and sculptures are exhibited.

The museum has several departments and collections:

- Collection of Paintings before 1945
- Collection of Paintings after 1945
- Collection of Graphics, Prints and foreign Paintings
  - Serbian and Yugoslav painters represented in the collection include: Sava Šumanović, Milena Pavlović-Barili, Vasa Pomorišac, Đorđe Andrejević Kun, Vane Bor, Leonid Šejka, Julije Knifer, Vladimir Veličković, Petar Lubarda, Krsto Hegedušić, Petar Omčikus, Mića Popović, Milovan Destil Marković, etc.
  - The foreign art collection has 323 works, mostly graphic prints and drawings.
    - Graphic works are by Roy Lichtenstein, Andy Warhol, Joan Miró, Georges Braque, Salvador Dalí, Jacques Villon, David Hockney, Robert Rauschenberg, Eduardo Paolozzi, Victor Vasarely, Hans Hartung, James Rosenquist, Josef Albers, Albert Gleizes, Max Bill, Lucio Fontana, Michelangelo Pistoletto, Frank Stella, Antoni Tàpies, Richard Hamilton (artist), etc.
    - Drawings works by : Fritz Wotruba
    - Paintings by Max Ernst, André Masson
- Collection of Sculptures
  - There are 752 sculptures by Ivan Meštrović, Antun Augustinčić, Toma Rosandić, Walter S. Arnold, Olga Jevrić, Olga Jančić, Dušan Džamonja, Sreten Stojanović, Lojze Dolinar, etc.
- Collection of New Art Media
  - Collection has works of Marina Abramović, Ken Friedman, George Maciunas, Hannah Wilke etc.
  - Library and catalogue library – over 4,800 books and 23,000 catalogues
  - Hemeroteque (archives) – more than 350,000 press clippings
  - Photo library

Departments:

- Department of General Affairs
- Department of Finance
- Studio for Conservation and Restoration

The museum also operates the Salon of the MoCAB (opened in 1961), located in old town Belgrade.

According to the curators, the most popular exhibits after the 2017 reopening include painting "On the black field" by Bora Iljovski, big balls sculpture "L-50" by Ivan Kožarić, sculpture "Light shapes" by Vojin Bakić and installation "Comrade Tito, (our) white violet" by Dušan Otašević.

== See also ==
- List of museums in Belgrade
- List of museums in Serbia
- Museum of Contemporary Art of Vojvodina
