= National Museum of Šumadija, Kragujevac =

National Museum of Šumadija in Kragujevac
- Народни музеј Шумадије у Крагујевцу; Narodni muzej Šumadije u Kragujevcu

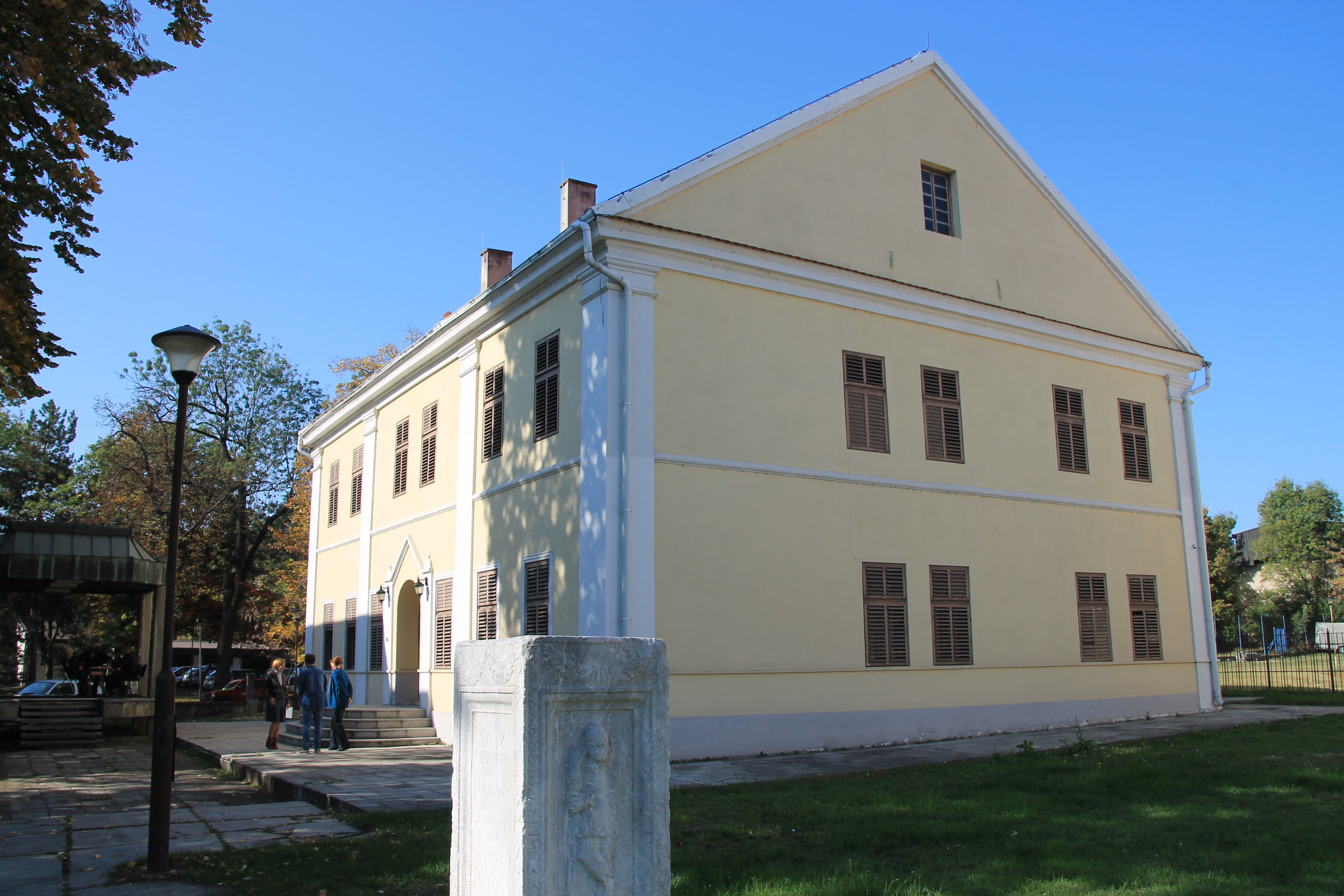
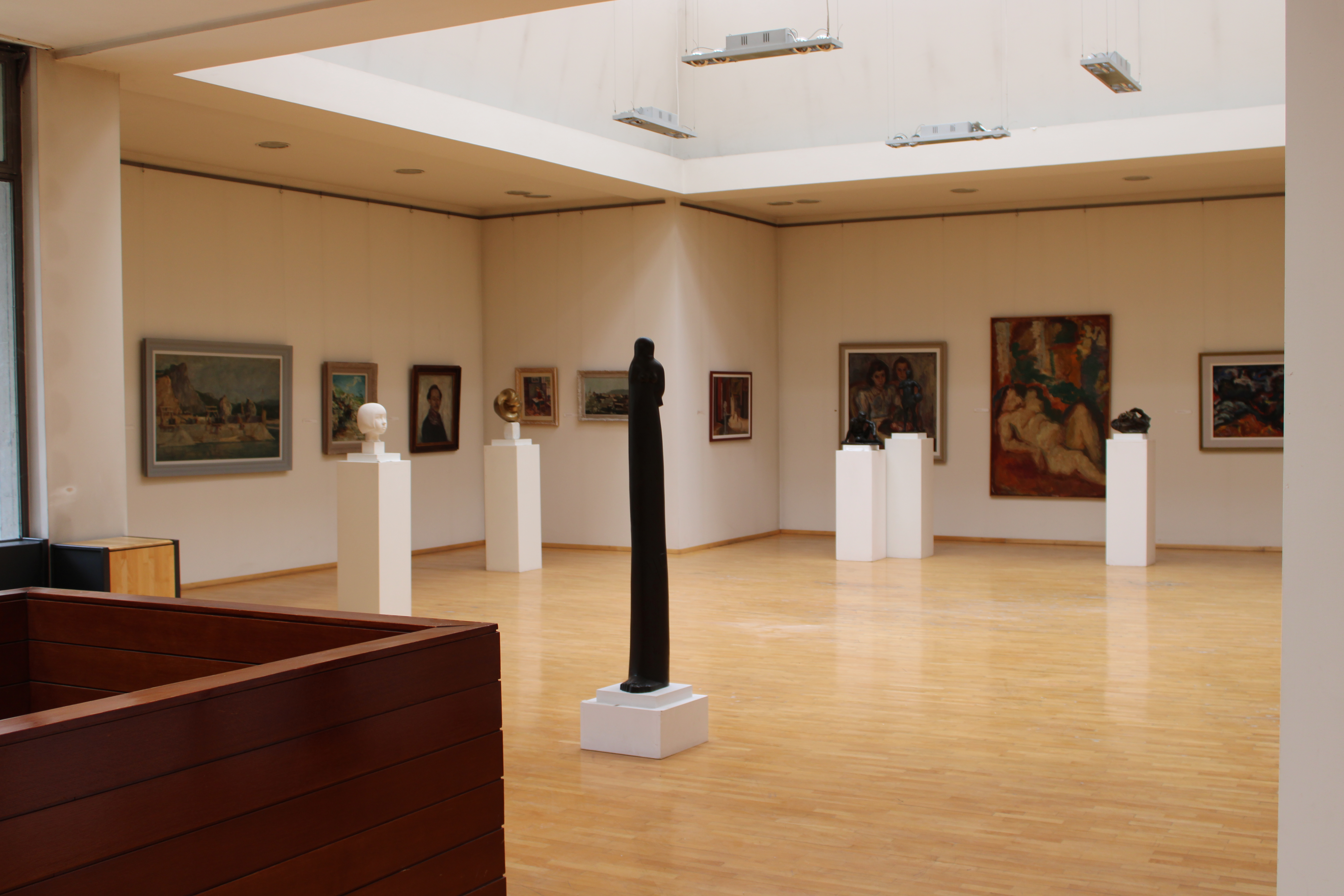
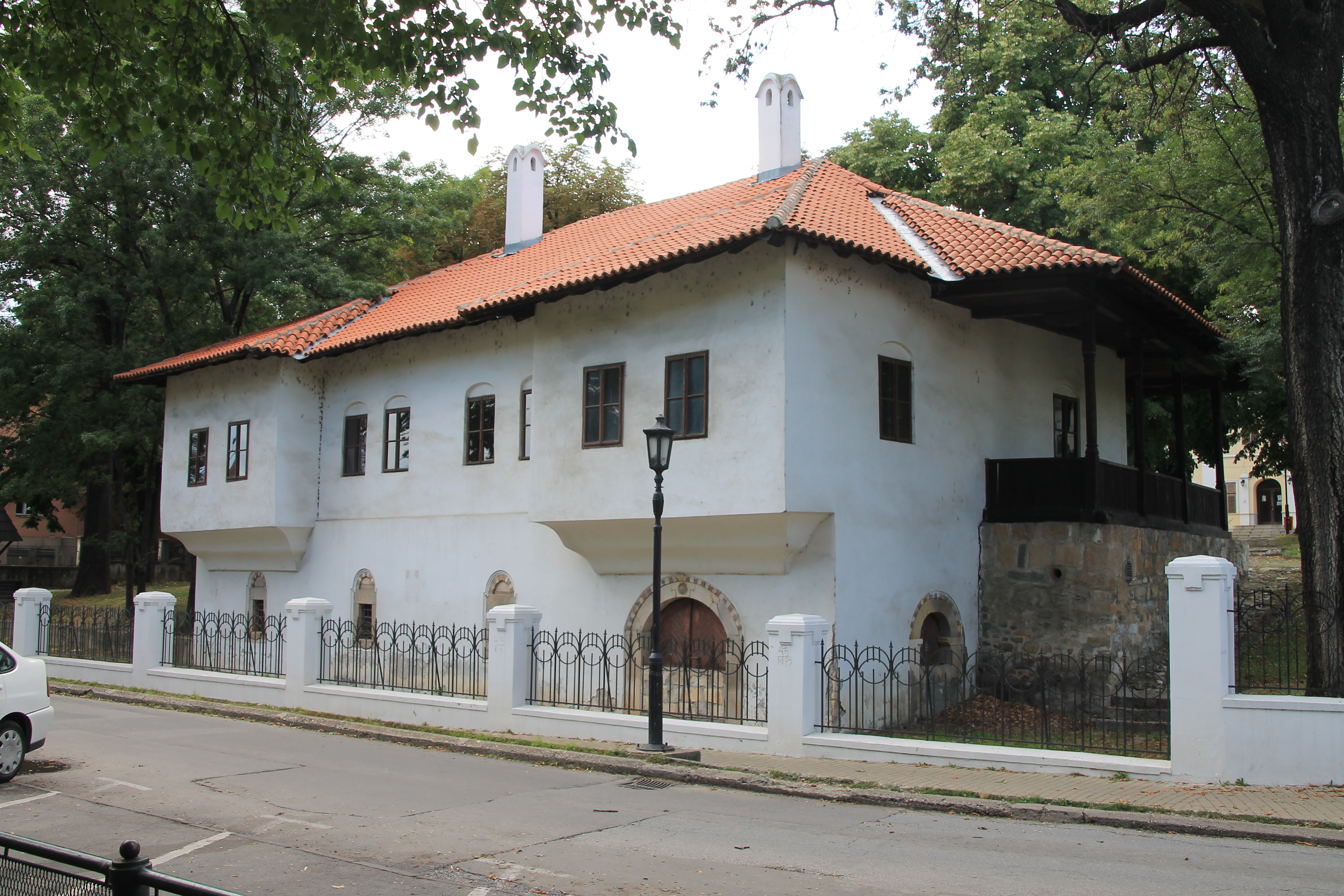
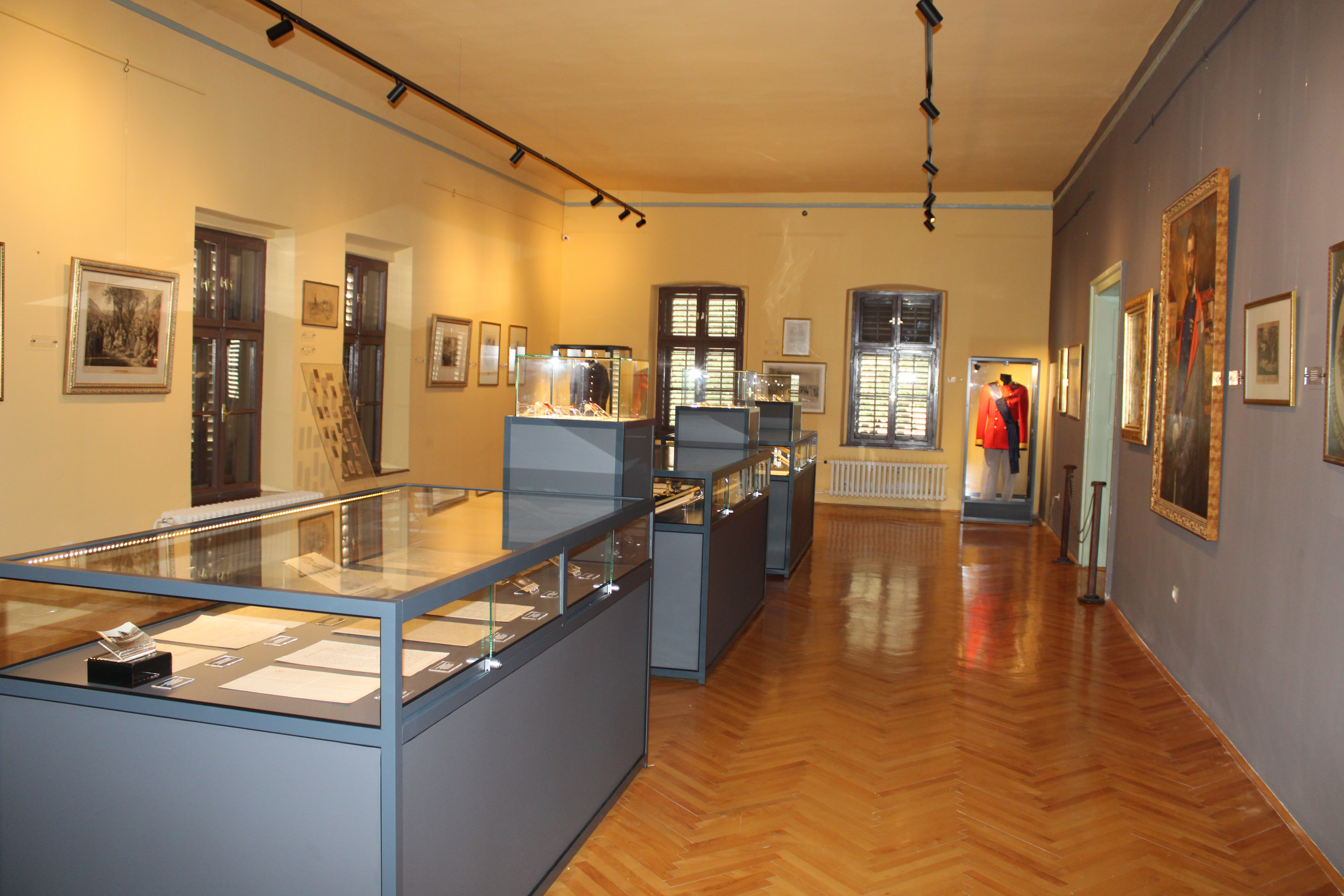
- Knez Mihailov Konak Art Gallery Kragujevac Amidža Konak Knez Mihailov Konak
- Established: 1949; 77 years ago
- Location: Vuka Karadžića 1, 34000 Kragujevac, Serbia
- Coordinates: 44°00′34″N 20°54′42″E
- Type: History museum Art museum
- Website: muzej.org.rs

The National Museum of Šumadija (Serbian: Народни музеј Шумадије) in Kragujevac, Serbia was founded in 1949 as the main museum of the city. The museum is named after the historical region of Šumadija. The museum includes buildings that were once part of Prince Miloš Obrenović court, as well as some of the oldest houses in Kragujevac. The museum houses archaeological, ethnological, historical, and artistic collections with over 26,000 artifacts.

== History ==
The origins of museums in Kragujevac date back to the early 19th century when the city of Kragujevac served as the capital of the newly independent Principality of Serbia. Prince Miloš Obrenović began forming his own collection of paintings in June 1823. In 1837, the German naturalist Baron Herder provided artifacts for Prince Miloš Obrenović which included an early numismatic collection. During World War II in Yugoslavia, the Šumadijski Museum was founded in Kragujevac in the spring of 1942 but was shut down on March 22, 1943.

The National Museum in Kragujevac was officially founded on June 1, 1949. The seat of the new museum was located in historical representative building of Amidža Konak. In 1963, the museum merged with the Museum of the Workers' Movement and National Liberation Struggle, consolidating its collections. In 1976, artifacts related to the 1941 Kragujevac massacre were transferred to the newly established 21st October Memorial Museum.

== See also ==
- List of museums in Serbia
- Šumarice Memorial Park
- Historical Archive of Šumadija in Kragujevac
