= Ivan Antić =

Serbian architect and academic

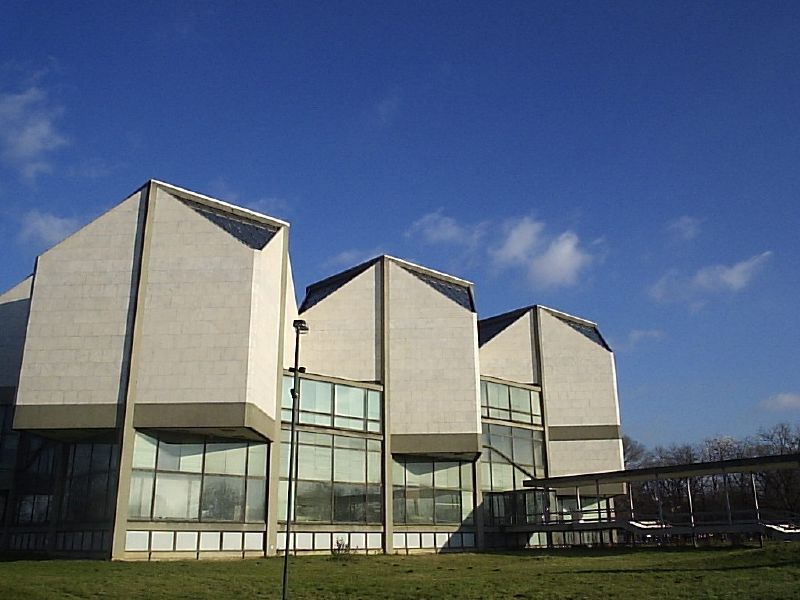
Museum of Contemporary Art

Ivan Antić (Serbian Cyrillic: Иван Антић; 1923–2005) was a Serbian architect and academic, considered one of Yugoslavia's best post-World War II architects. He worked on several projects with architect Ivanka Raspopović.

== Biography ==
Antić studied in Belgrade from 1945 until graduating in 1950. While studying, he worked for the Ministry of Transportation and from 1950 until 1953 he worked for the "Jugoprojekt Office". Here, he learned the practical skills of his profession and would also meet both Stanko Kliska and Vojin Simeonović (both famous architects in former Yugoslavia). After 1957 he started to design his own projects before joining the University of Belgrade Faculty of Architecture, first as an assistant and later as a professor. He was a member of the Serbian Academy (SANU) and his buildings are considered masterpieces of Serbian modern architecture: they are functional and aesthetic.

Antić died in Belgrade in 2005.

== Architecture ==
Some of his famous works are:

- Museum of Contemporary Art, Belgrade, Serbia (co-designed with Ivanka Raspopović)
- Sport-Recreational Center "25 May", Belgrade, Serbia
- 21 October Museum in Šumarice Memorial Park, Kragujevac, Serbia (co-designed with Ivanka Raspopović)
