= Amidža Konak =

Palaces in Serbia

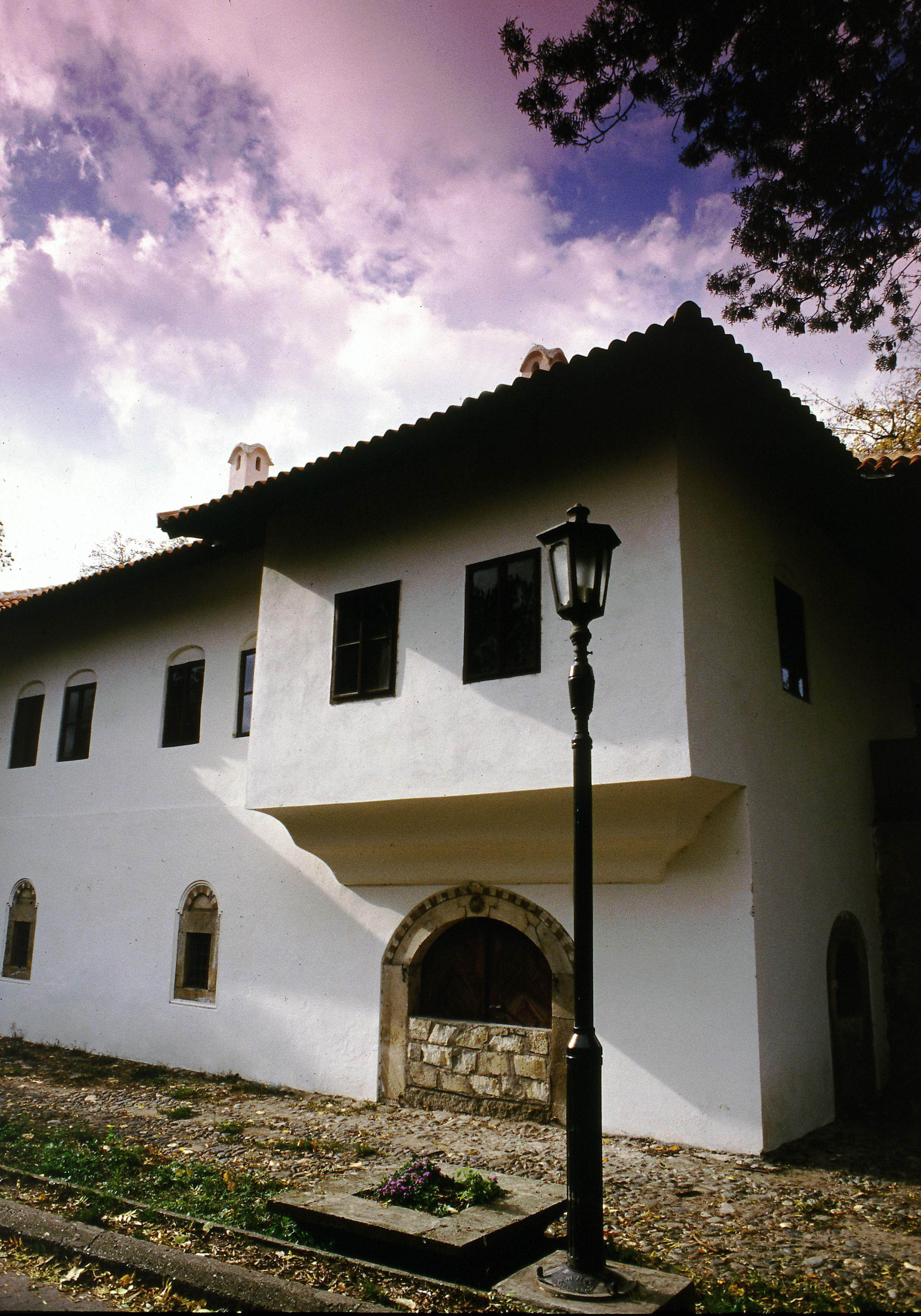
- Front of the Konak
- Interactive map of the Amidža Konak area

General information
- Architectural style: Balkan
- Location: Kragujevac, Serbia
- Coordinates: 44°00′33.5″N 20°54′42.5″E
- Construction started: 1819
- Completed: 1824
- Client: Sima Milosavljević-Paštrmc (Miloš Obrenović)

Amidža Konak (Serbian: Амиџин конак / Amidžin konak, from Turkish: amca, meaning "uncle"; English: Uncle's Residence) is a 19th-century residence of Ottoman-style architecture located in the old part of the city of Kragujevac in central Serbia. It was built in 1819–1824 by Serbian Prince Miloš Obrenović, and it was named after Sima Milosavljević-Paštrmac, called Amidža, a Serbian hajduk and staff member of the court of Obrenović. Only Amidža Konak remained from large complex of building that existed during Miloš Obrenović time. Nearby, Miloš's Konak existed, and it was destroyed in 1941, during World War II, and also, Princess Ljubica Konak, that burned down in 1884.

Amidža Konak served as a residence of Sima and his colleagues that passed through Kragujevac, and now serves as a national museum.

It is part of Cultural Monuments of Great Importance.

== See also ==
- Kragujevac
- Tourism in Serbia
