= Šumarice Memorial Park =

Memorial Park in Kragujevac, Serbia

Coordinates: 44°01′24″N 20°54′02″E

October in Kragujevac Memorial Park
- Spomen-park „Kragujevački oktobar" / Спомен-парк „Крагујевачки октобар" (Serbian)
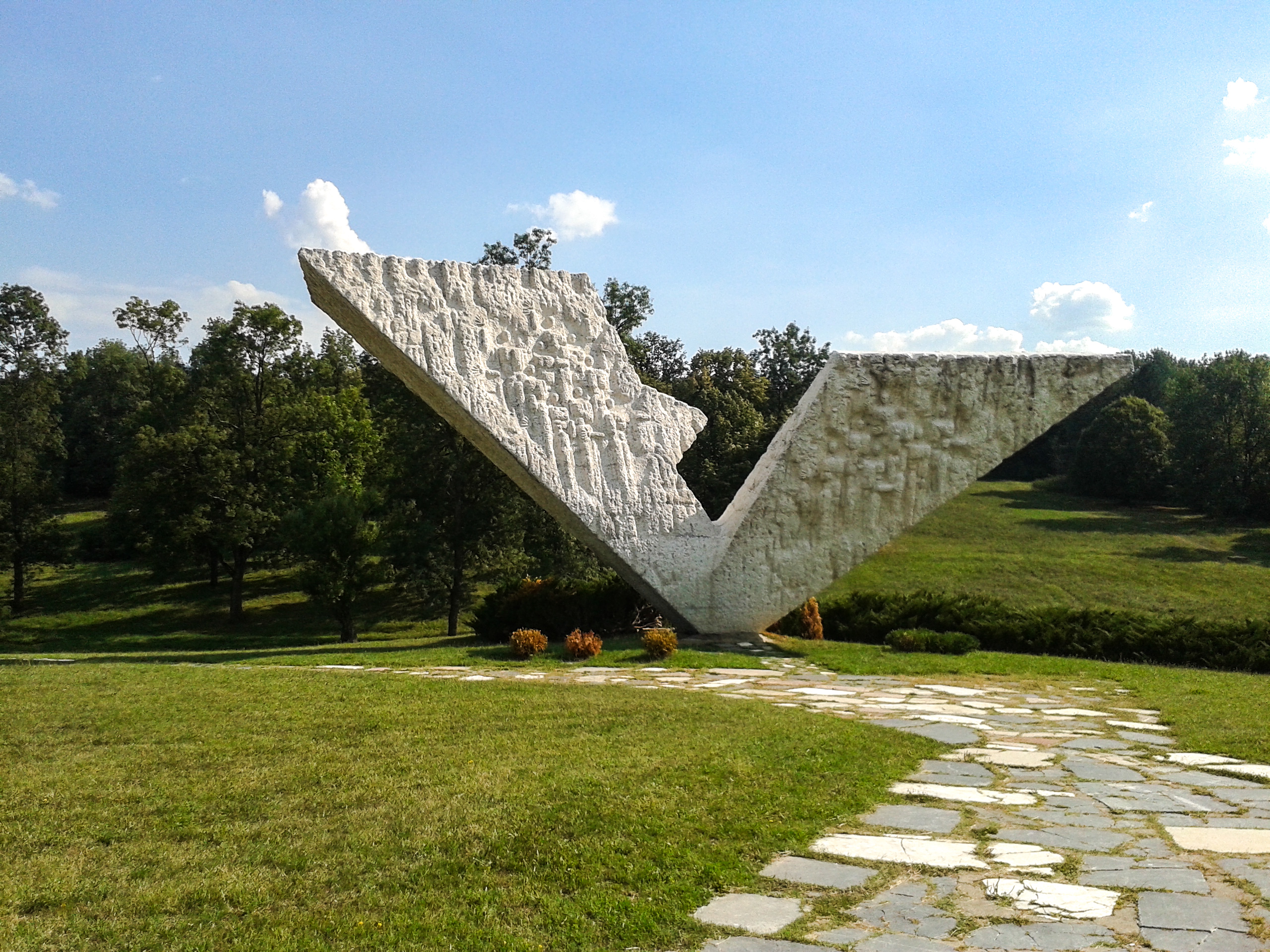
- "Interrupted Flight" monument
- Interactive map of October in Kragujevac Memorial Park
- Type: Memorial park
- Location: Kragujevac, Serbia

History
- Built: 1953

Site notes
- Area: 350 hectares (860 acres)
- Architect(s): Mihajlo Mitrović and Radivoje Tomić

Cultural Heritage of Serbia
- Type: Historic Landmark of Exceptional Importance
- Designated: 1979
- Reference no.: ЗМ 9

October in Kragujevac Memorial Park (Serbian: Spomen-park „Kragujevački oktobar", Спомен-парк „Крагујевачки октобар"), also known as Šumarice Memorial Park (Memorijalni park Šumarice, Меморијални парк Шумарице), is the site near Kragujevac, Serbia of the execution of an estimated 2,800 men and boys of the town by the German occupation forces on October 21, 1941, during World War II (Kragujevac massacre). Among the dead were hundreds of high school students. The 21 October Museum was designed by architect Ivan Antić is located at the site of the massacre.

Monuments within the park include the monument to the murdered schoolchildren and their teachers (the "Interrupted Flight" monument) by sculptor Miodrag Živković; the "Monument of pain and defiance" by sculptor Ante Gržetić; the "One hundred for one" monument by Nandor Glid; the "Resistance and Freedom" monument by Gržetić; and the Shoeshiners monument ("Crystal Flower") by architect Nebojša Delja. The complex also contains the Monument to the Slovaks killed during the World War I and the old World War 1 military cemetery with a Monument to Serbian soldier.

The Germans carried out the first mass executions in the vicinity of Kragujevac on October 19, 1941. On that day, they forcibly gathered 246 people in the village of Grošnica and took them out for shooting. They liquidated 233 people, while 13 people survived the shooting. The next day, on October 20, one person out of these 13 died as a result of his injuries, so the Germans in the village of Grošnice committed a war crime by shooting a total of 234 people of Serbian nationality.

On the same day, October 19, the Germans raided and rounded up 109 people for shooting in the village of Maršić. They liquidated 103 people, while 6 people survived the shooting. In the village of Mečkovac (today Ilićevo) they took 78 people to be shot. They liquidated 75 people, while 3 people survived the shooting. On October 19, 1941, the German armed forces committed a war crime by shooting in the vicinity of Kragujevac, in the villages of Grošnica, Maršić and Ilićevo, a total of 412 civilians of Serbian nationality.

In December 2020 an exhibit about the Jasenovac concentration and extermination camp was held.

== Gallery ==
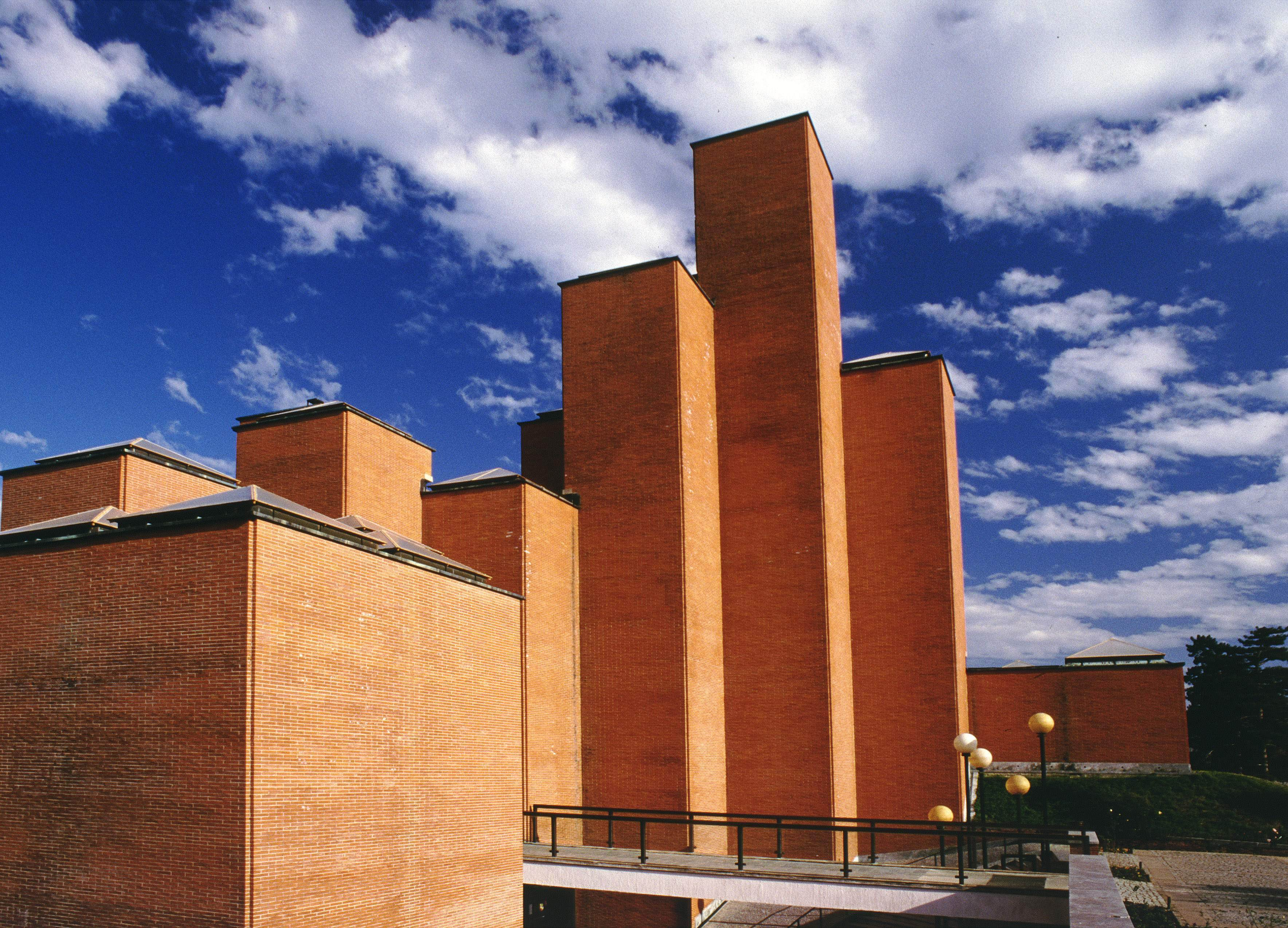
21 October Museum

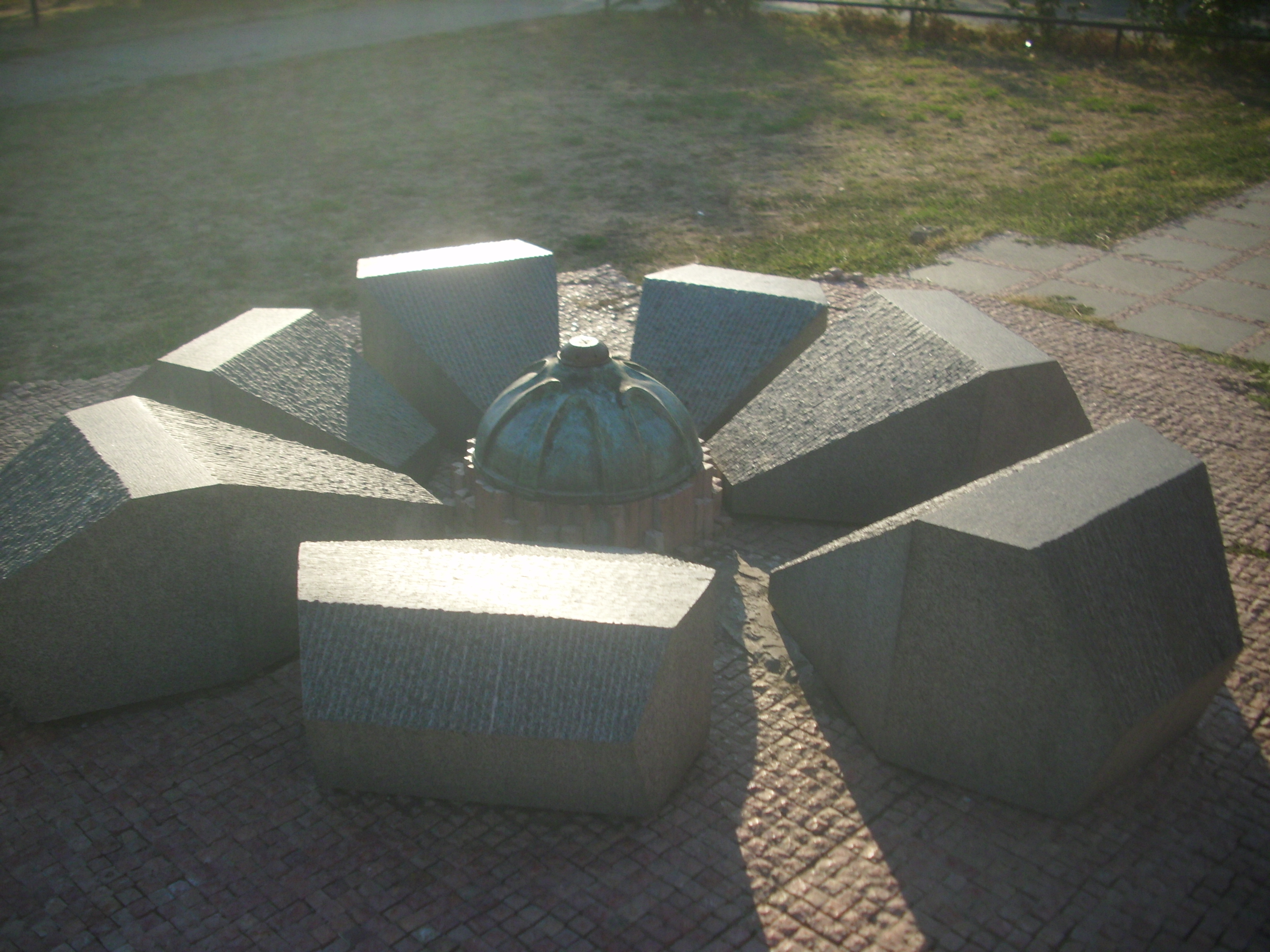
Eternal "Flame of Freedom"

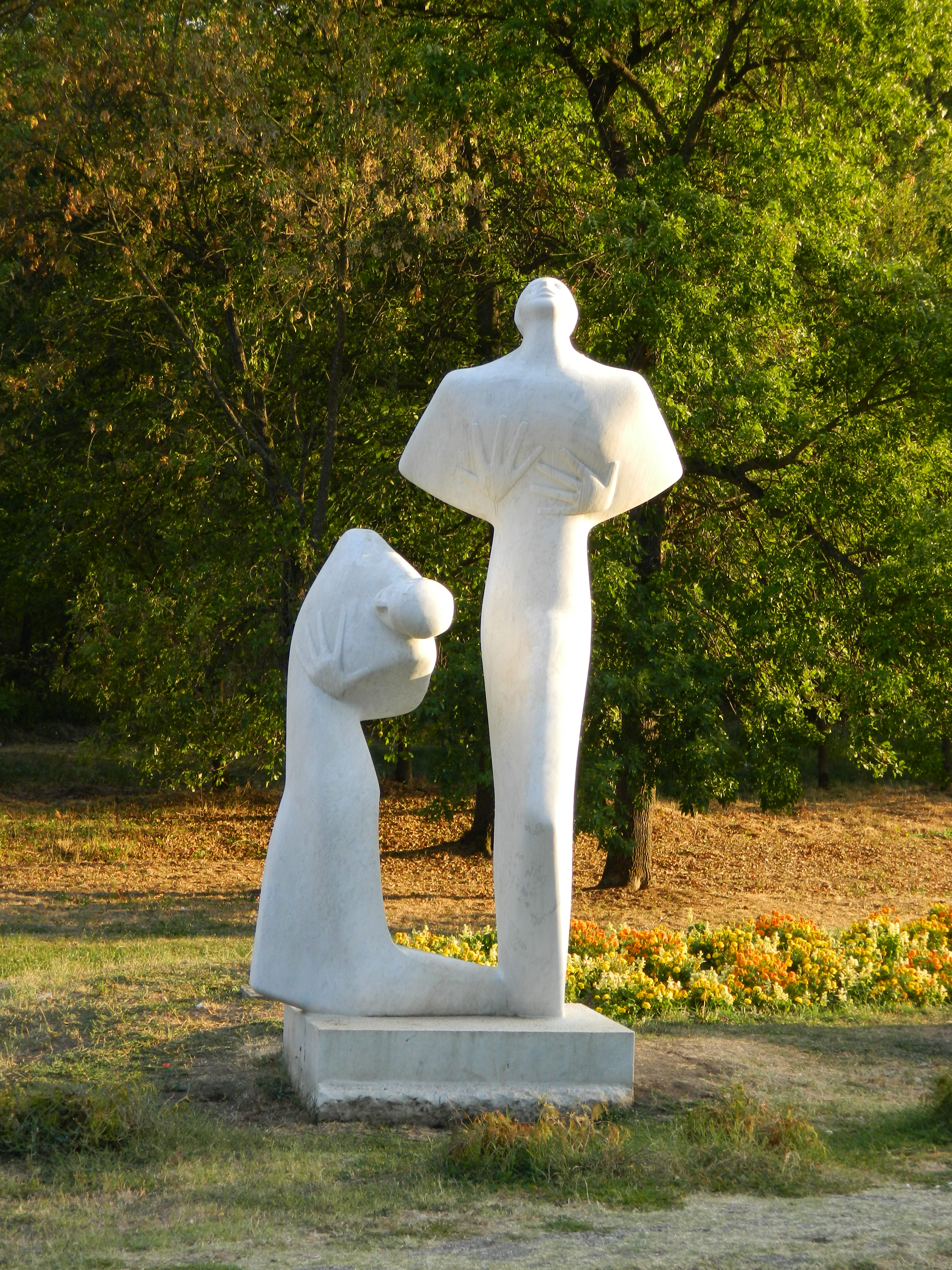
"Pain and Defiance" monument

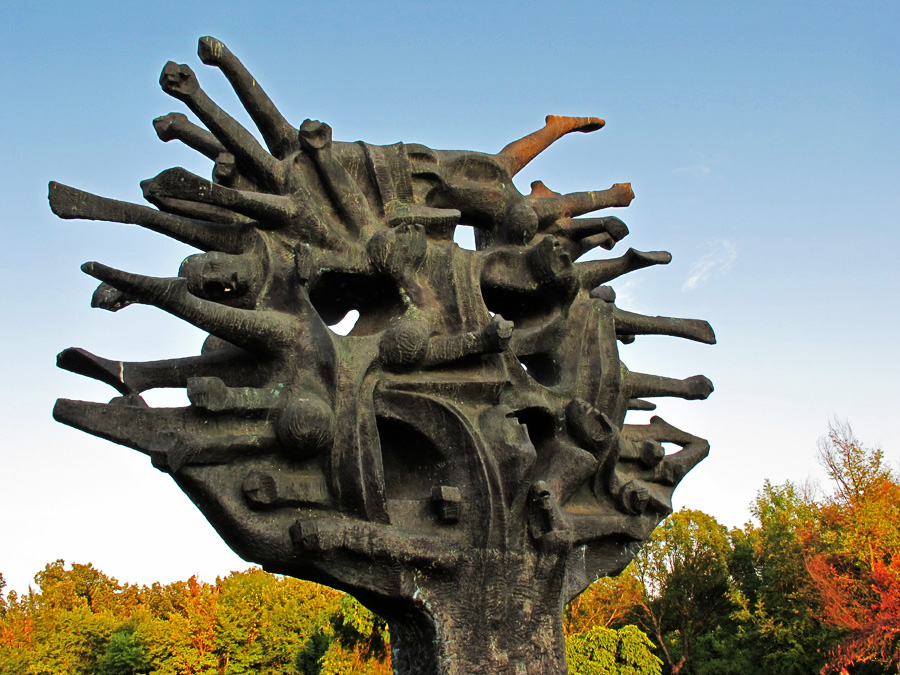
"One hundred for one" monument
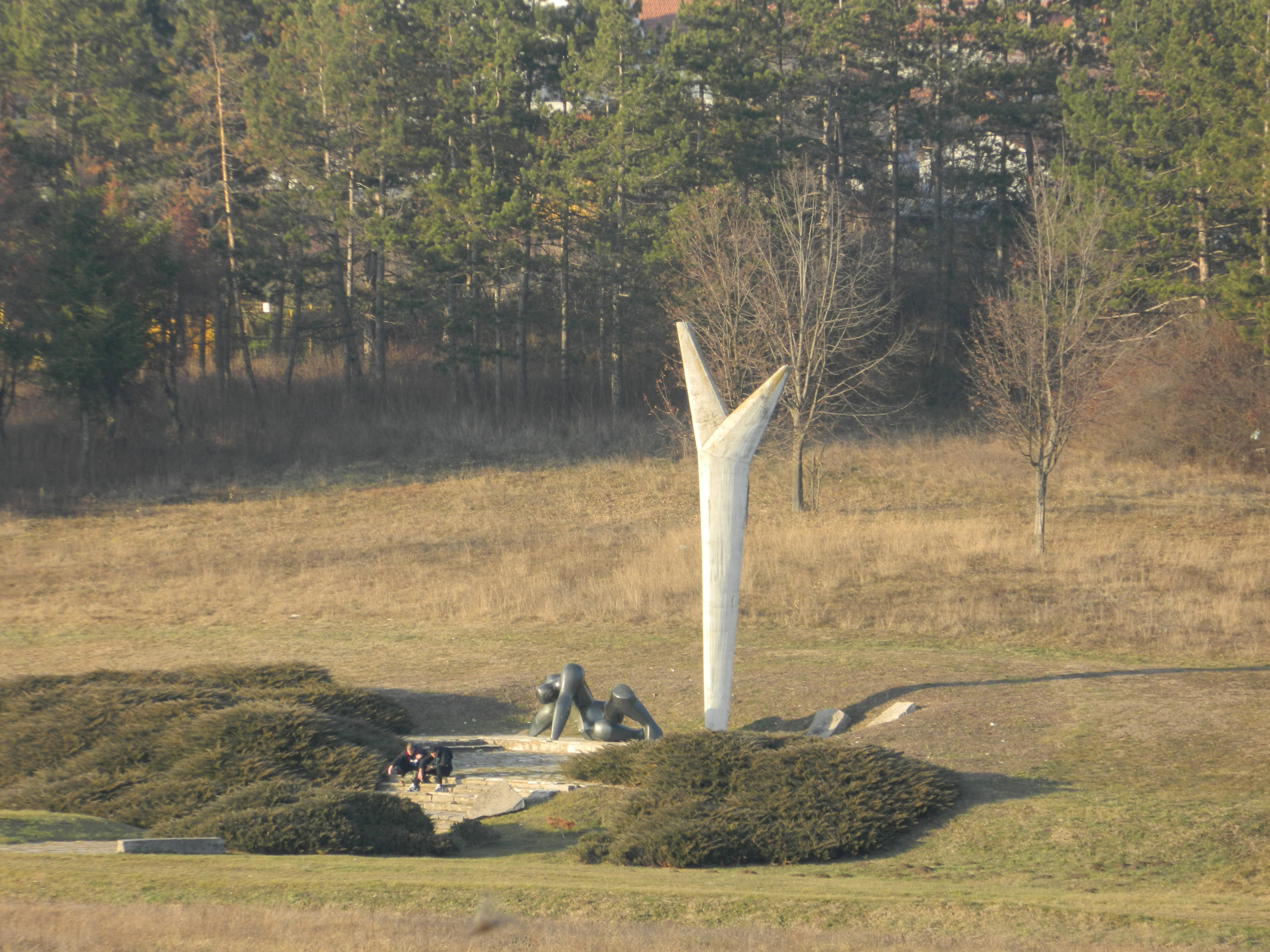
"Resistance and Freedom" monument

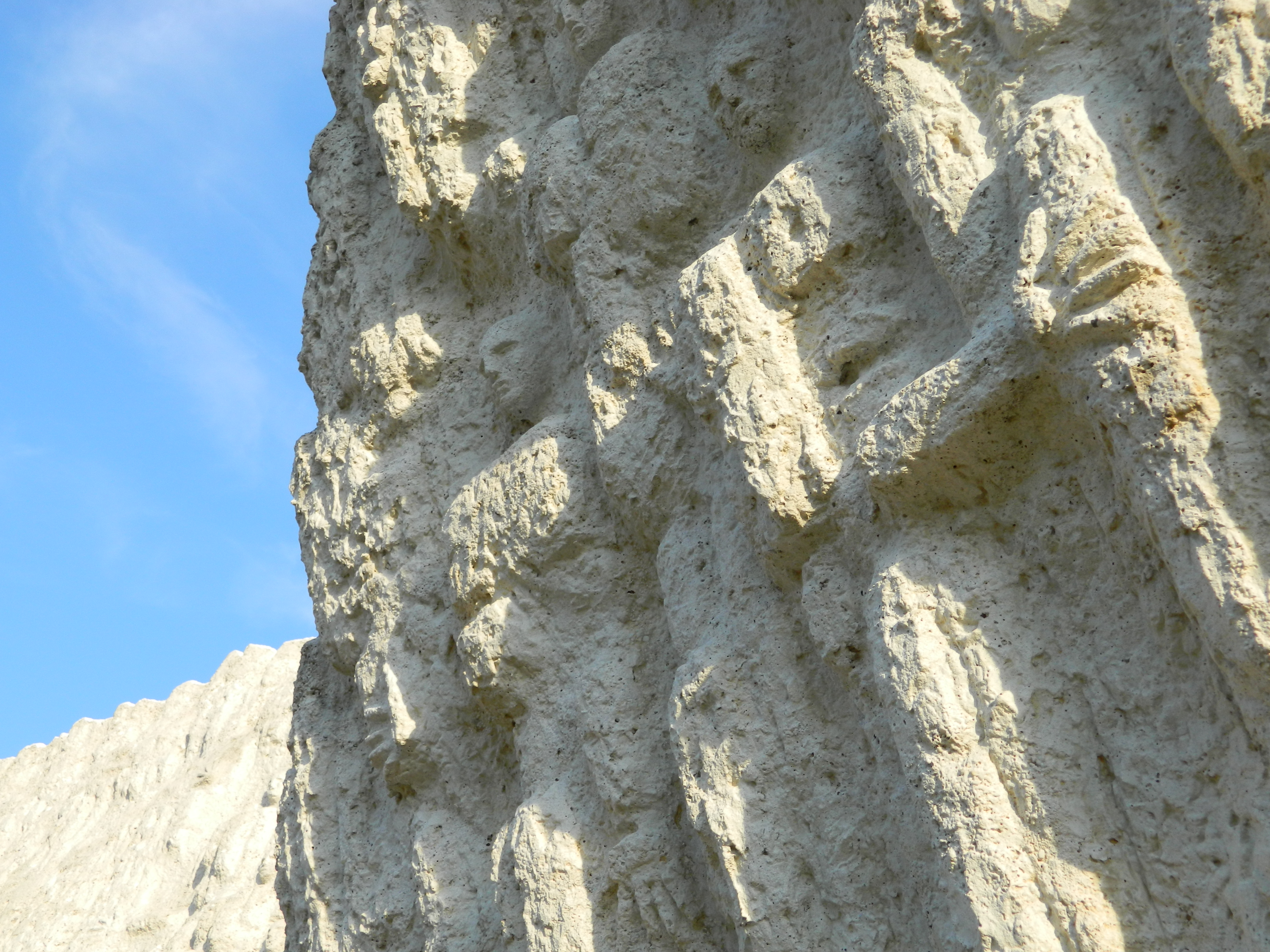
detail of the "Interrupted Flight" monument

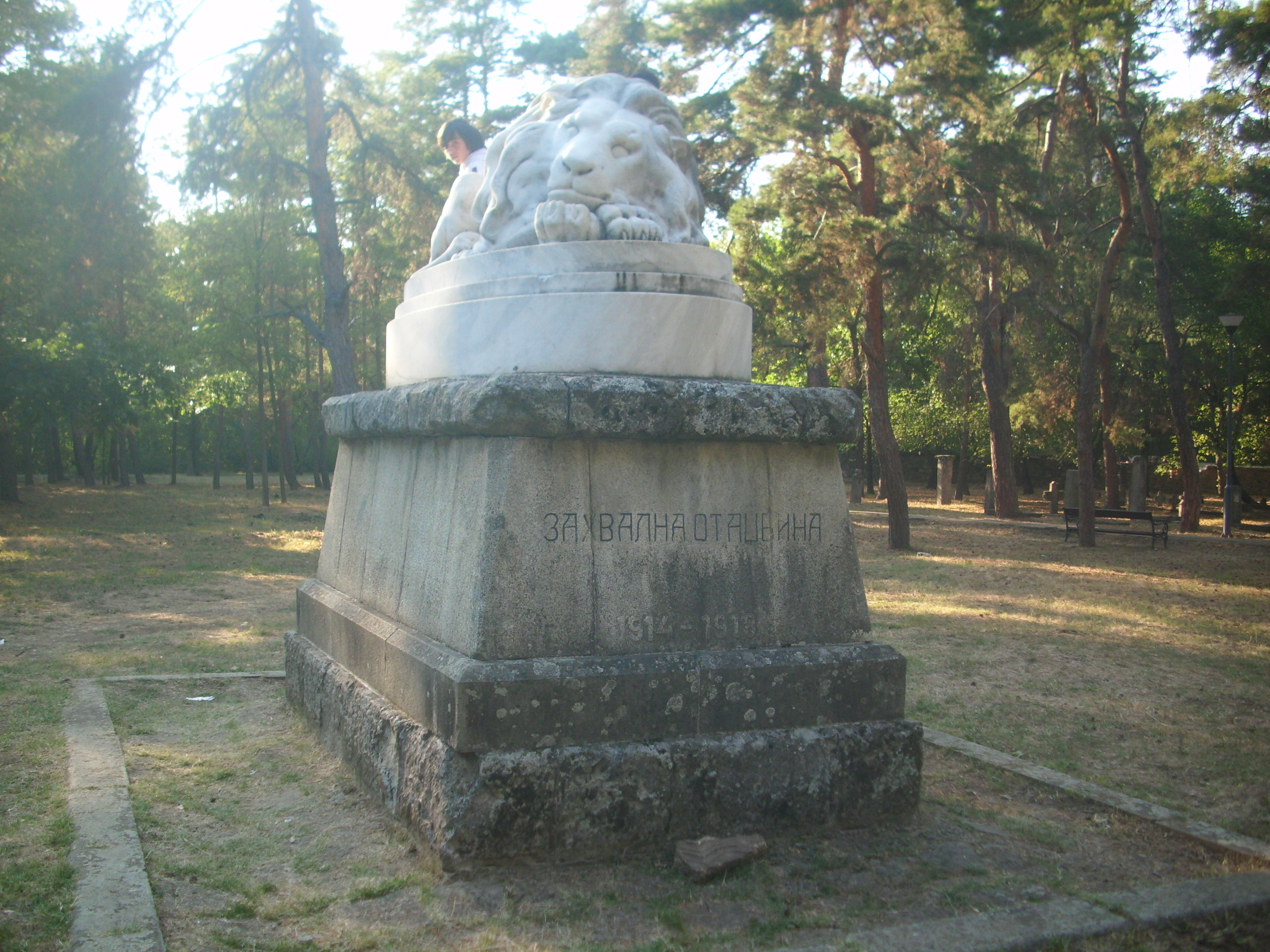
Monument to the victims of World War I

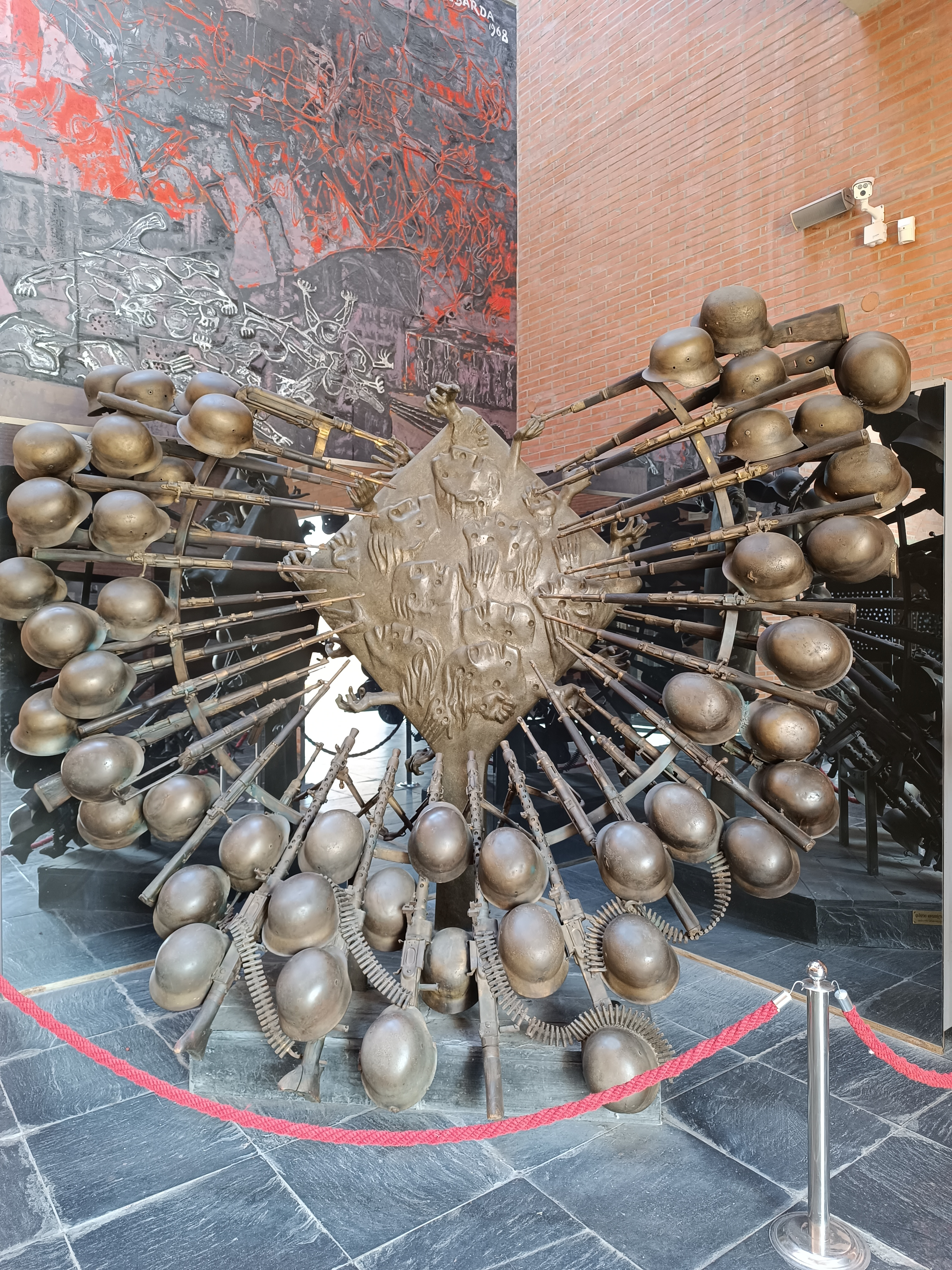
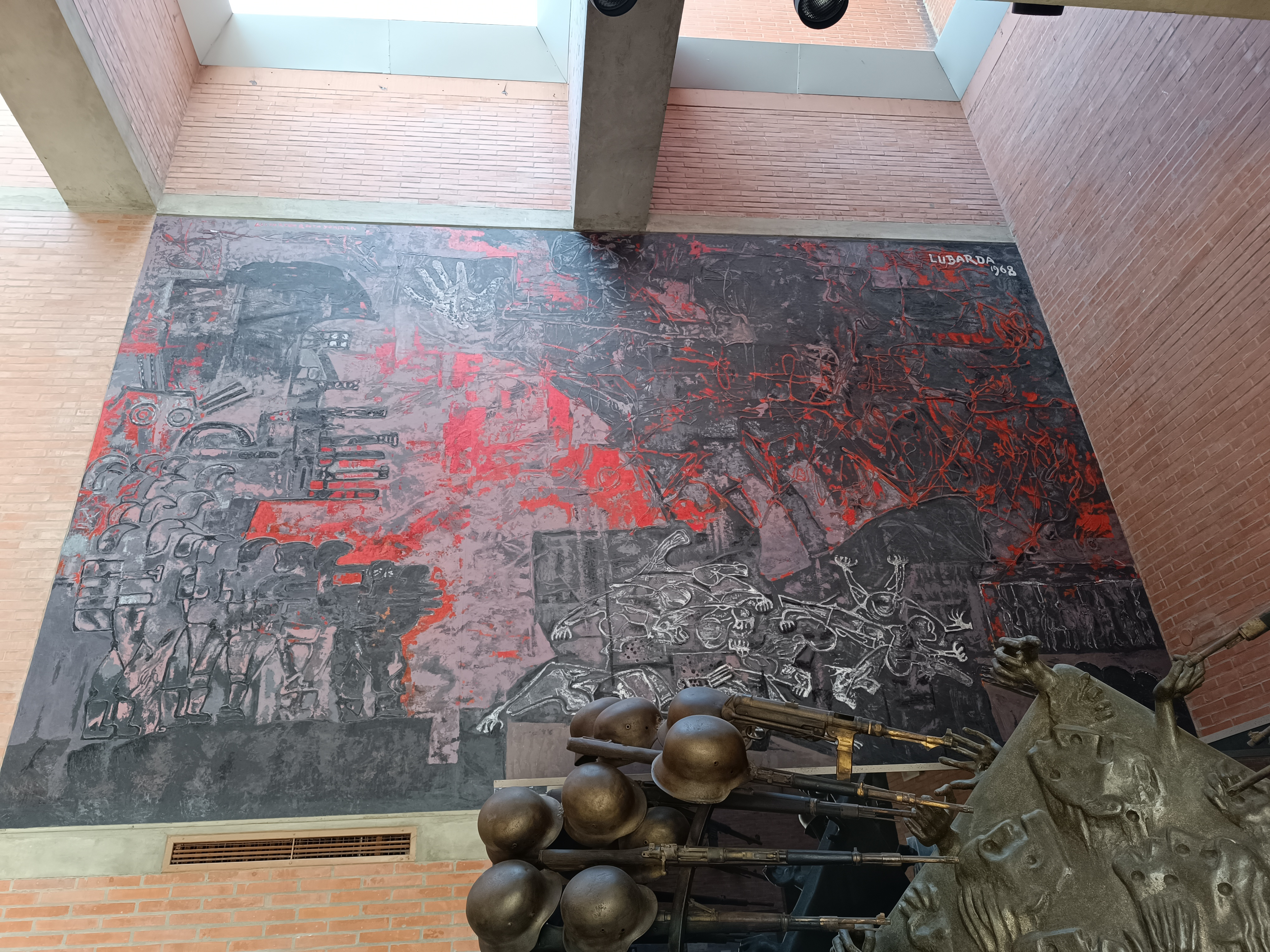

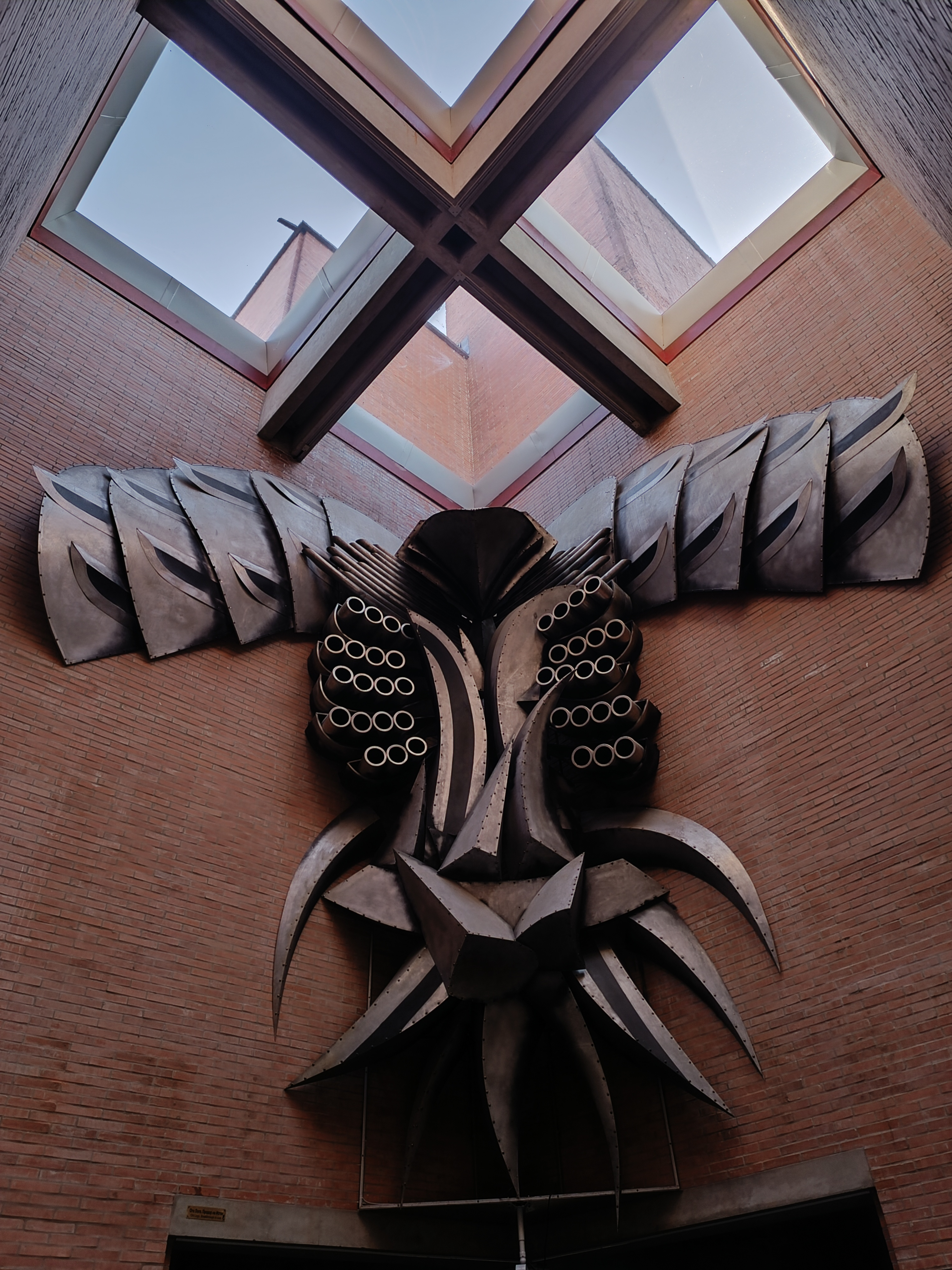

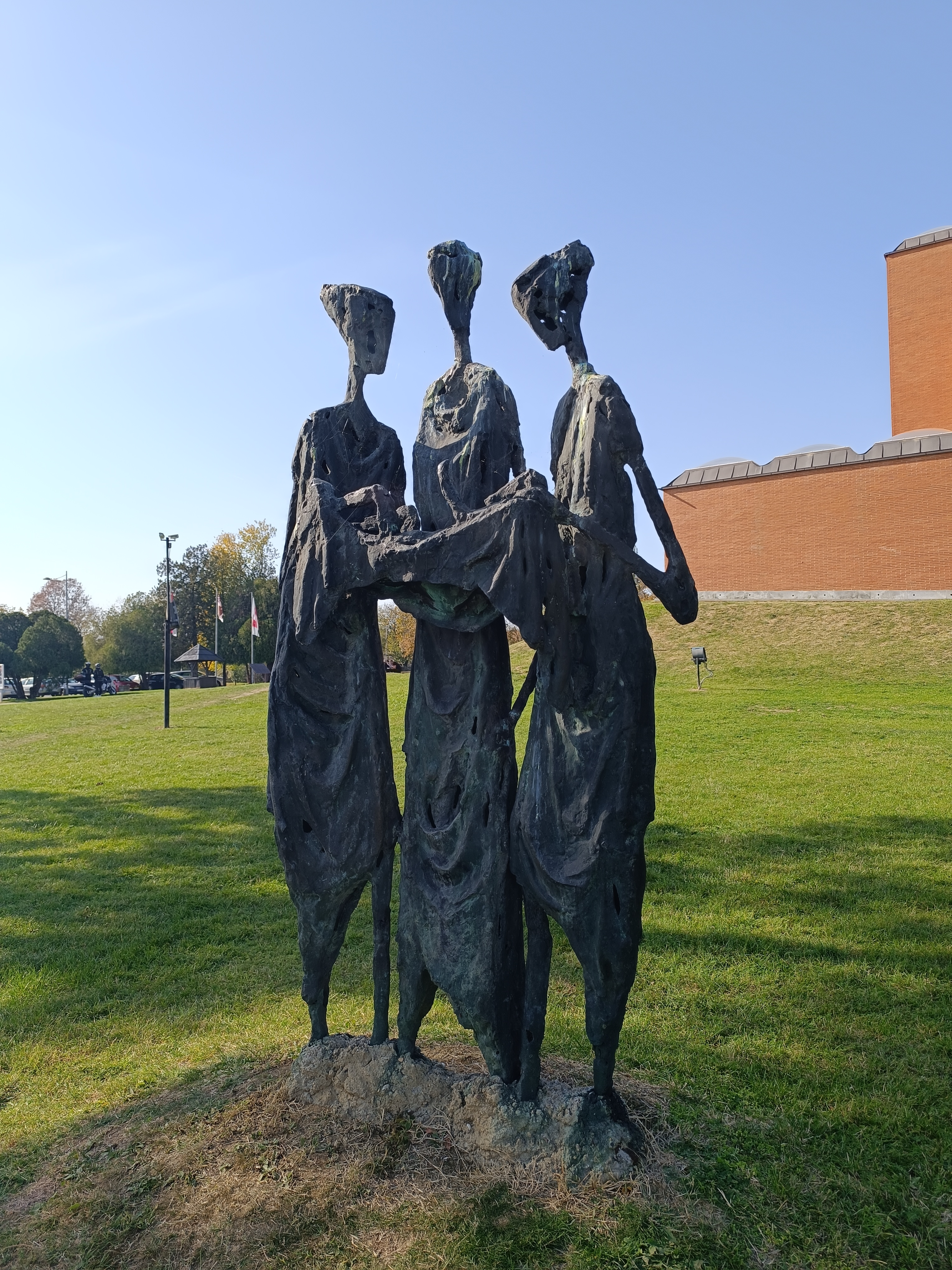

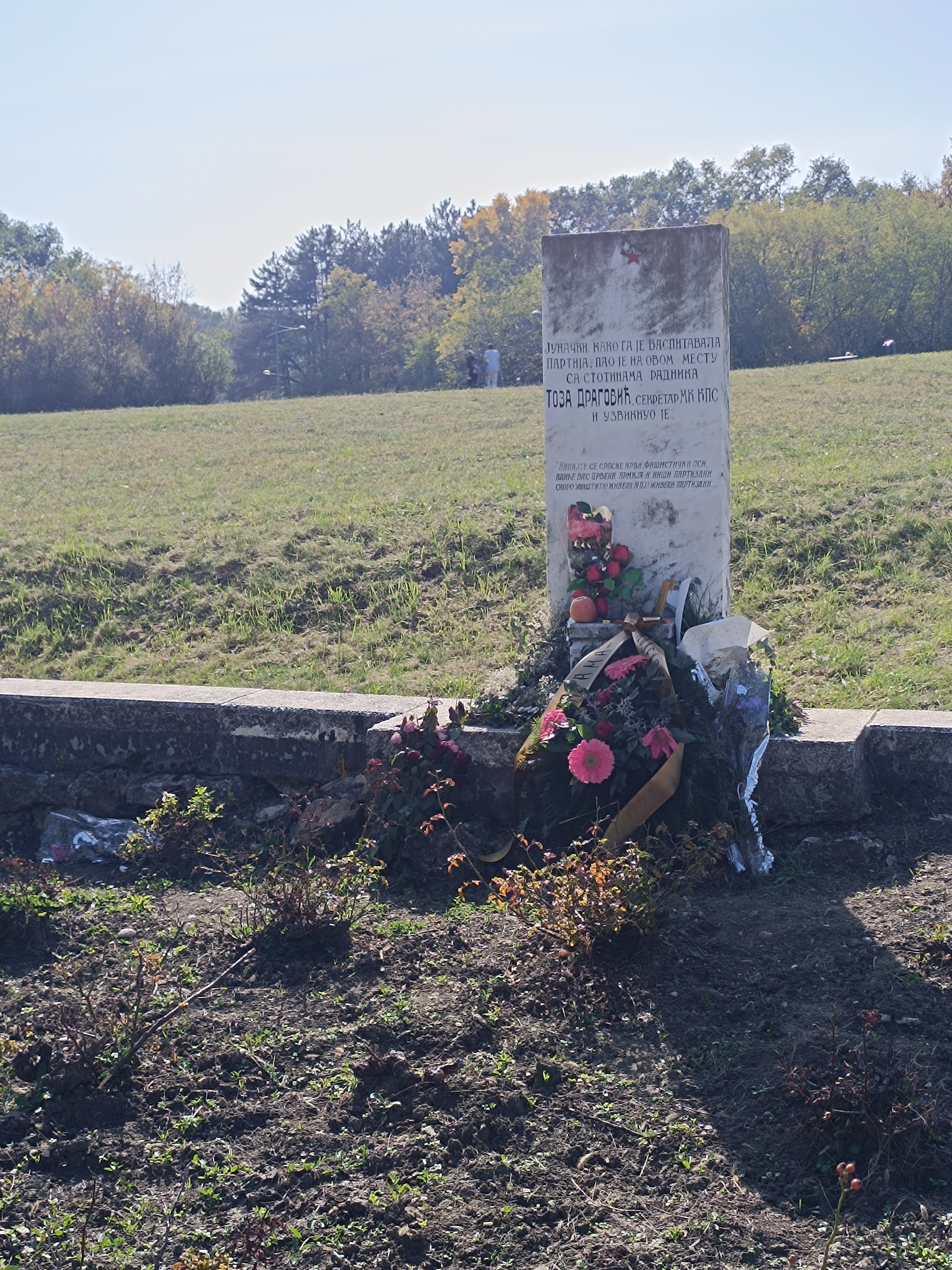
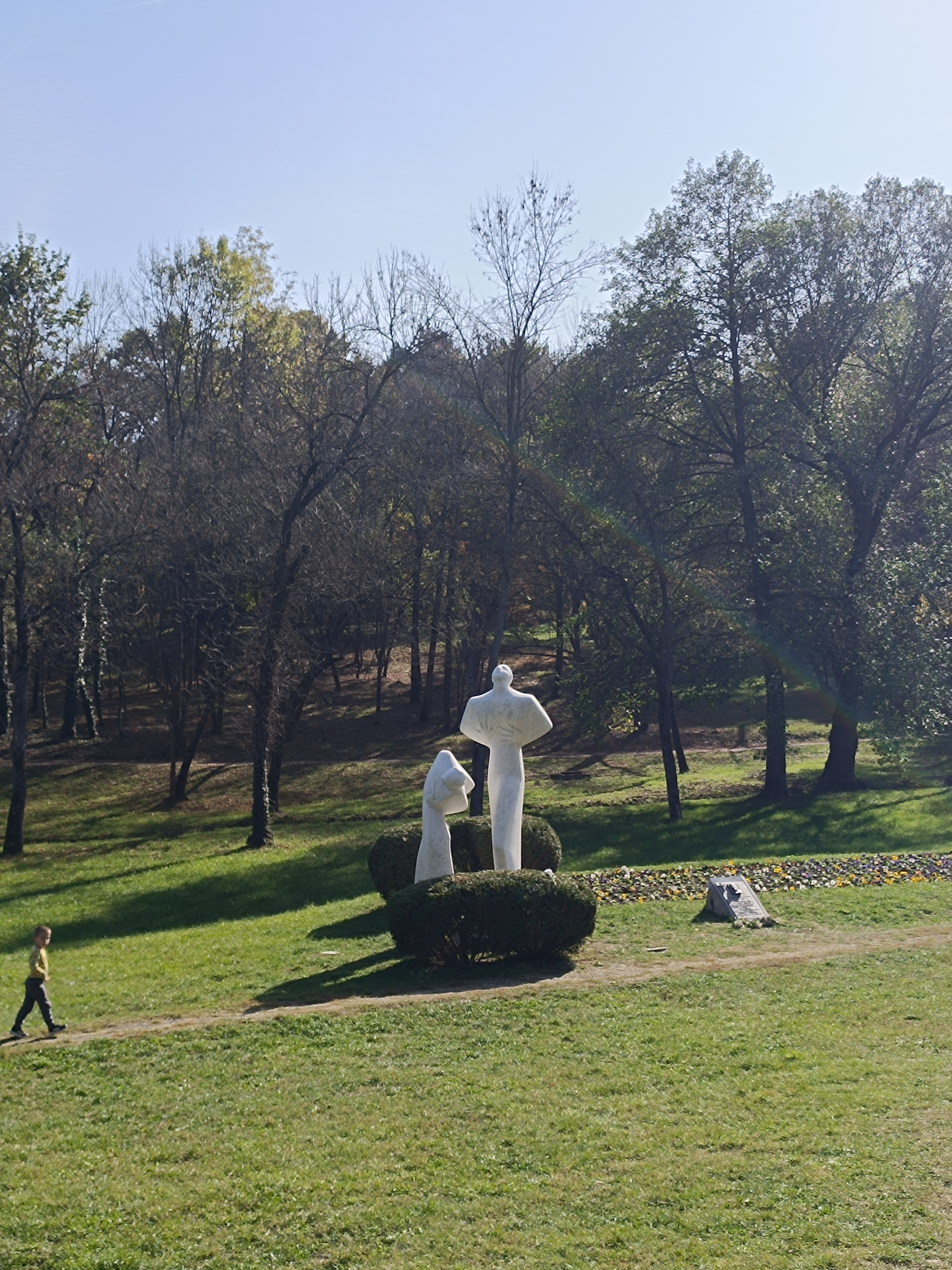

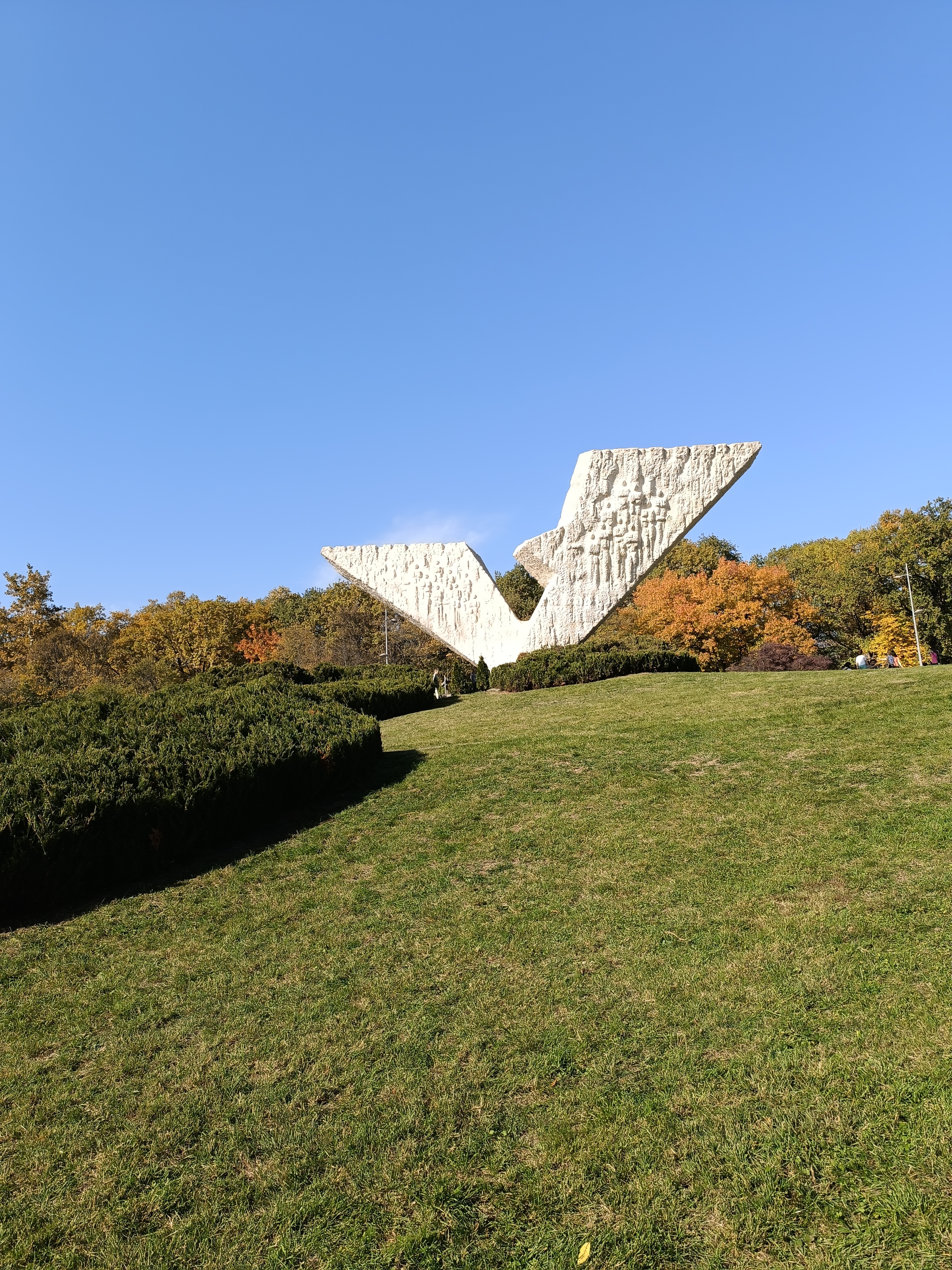

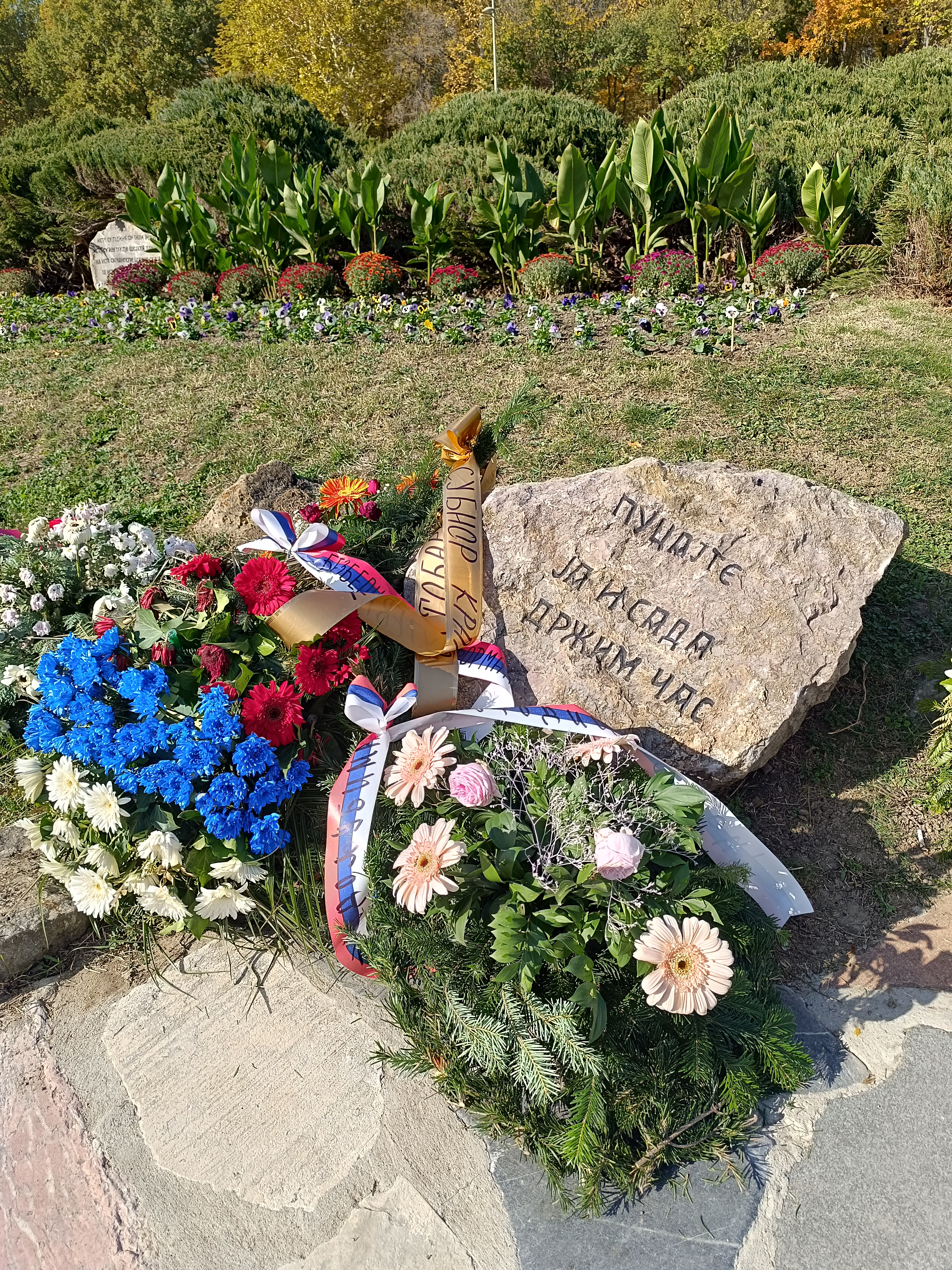

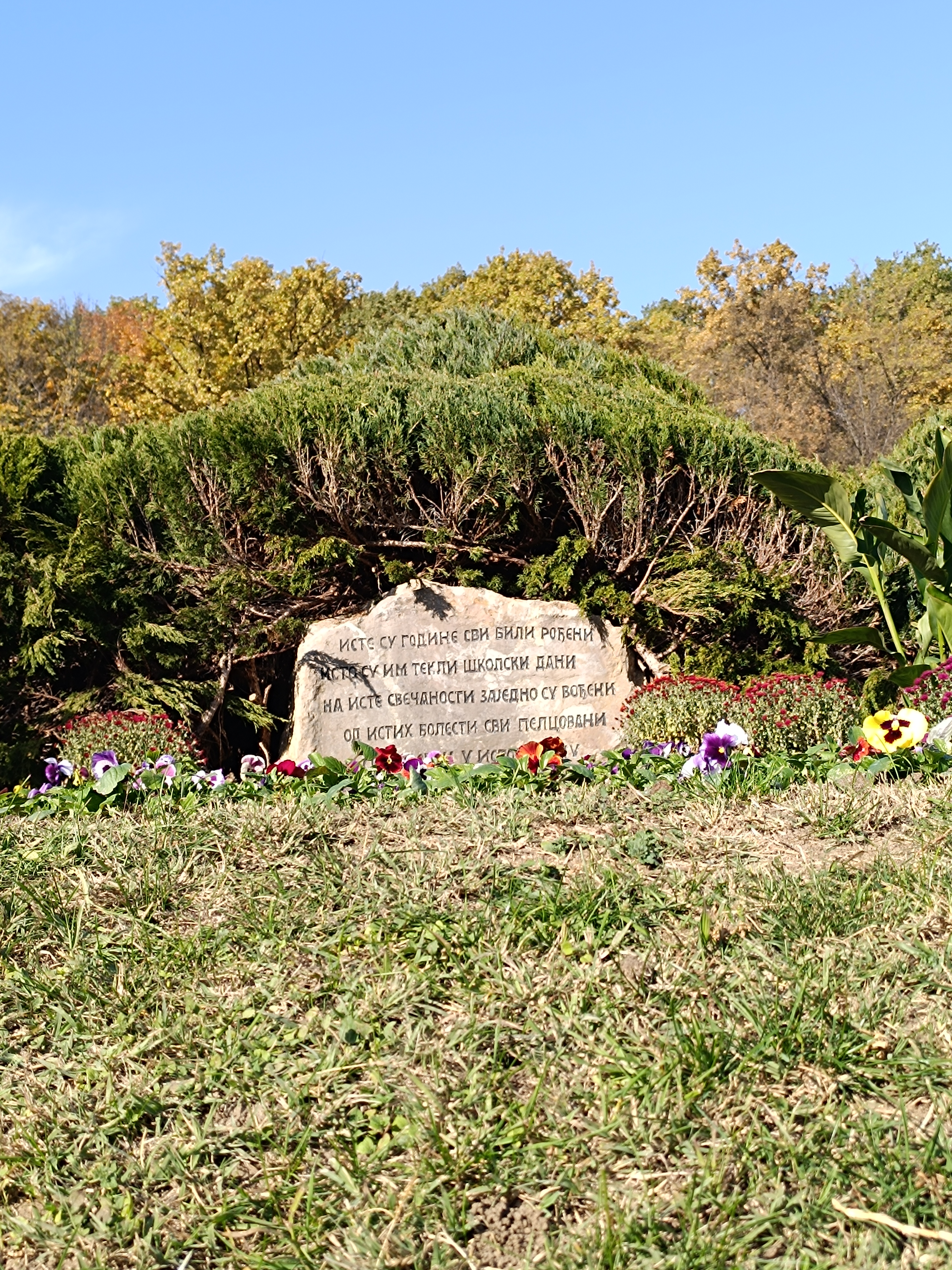

== See also ==
- List of Yugoslav World War II monuments and memorials in Serbia
- Historic Landmarks of Exceptional Importance
- List of museums in Serbia
- National Museum of Šumadija, Kragujevac
