= Architecture of Serbia =

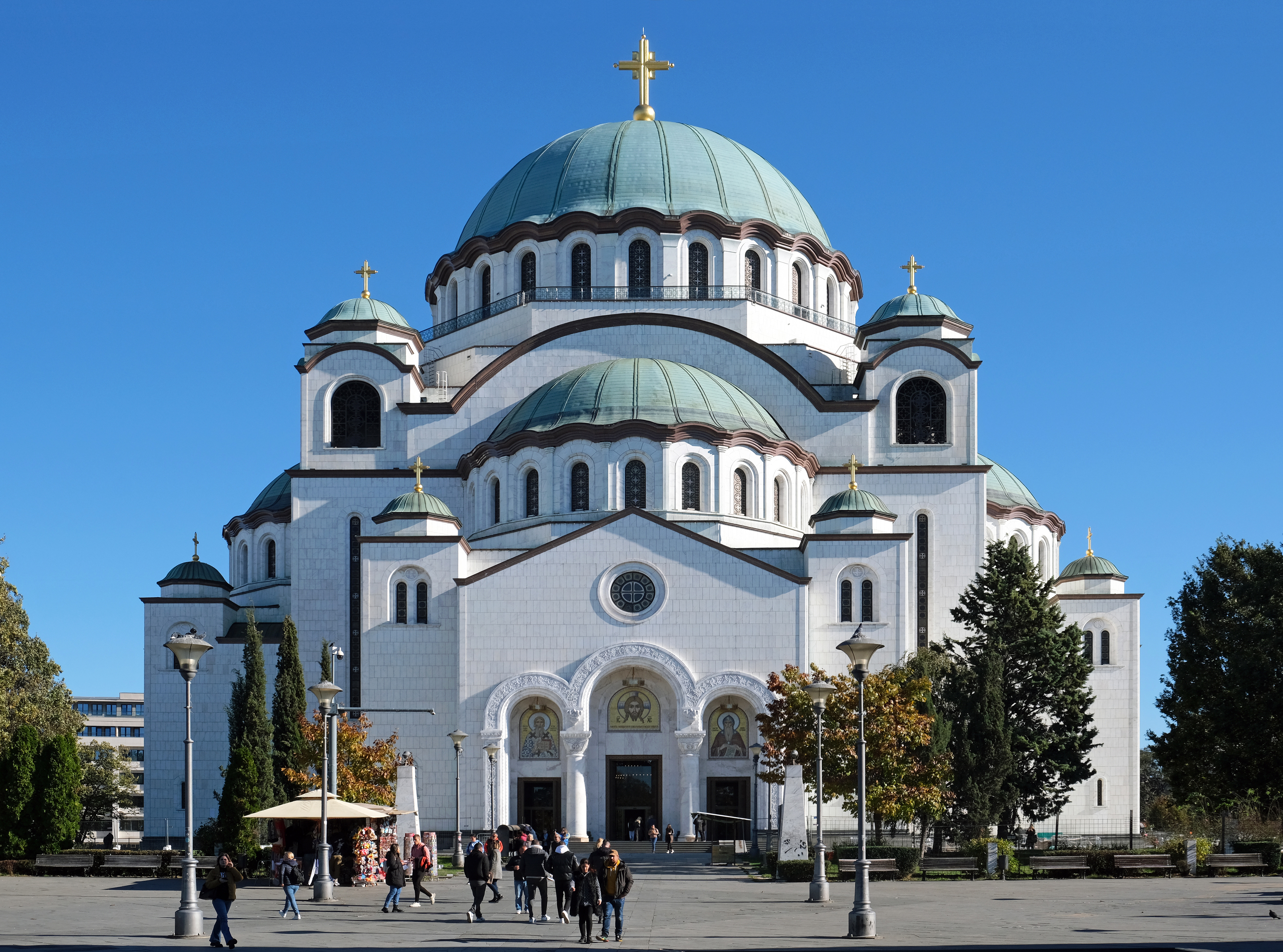
Church of Saint Sava by Bogdan Nestorović, Aleksandar Deroko and Branko Pešić in Belgrade, 2004

The architecture of Serbia has a long, rich and diverse history. Some of the major European style from Roman to Postmodern are demonstrated, including renowned examples of Raška, Serbo-Byzantine with its revival, Morava, Baroque, Classical and Modern architecture, with prime examples in Brutalism and Streamline Moderne.

Centuries of turbulent history of Serbia caused a great regional diversity and favored vernacular architecture. This made for a heterogeneous and diverse architectural style, with architecture differing from town to town. While this diversity may still be witnessed in small towns, the devastation of architectural heritage in the larger cities during World War II, and subsequent socialist influence on architecture resulted in specific mix of architectural styles.

== Prehistoric period ==
Numerous civilizations and cultures resided on the territory of Serbia prior to the arrival of the Romans. Best known ones were Starčevo, Iron Gates and Vinča cultures, dating between 7000 BCE to 4500 BCE. The oldest human remains were found in Sićevo believed to be up to 525,000–397,000 years old.

Prehistoric structures are simple in design, using local materials such as wood, mud, straw, rocks and earth for building, with simple geometric patters such as pyramidal huts and round mounts.

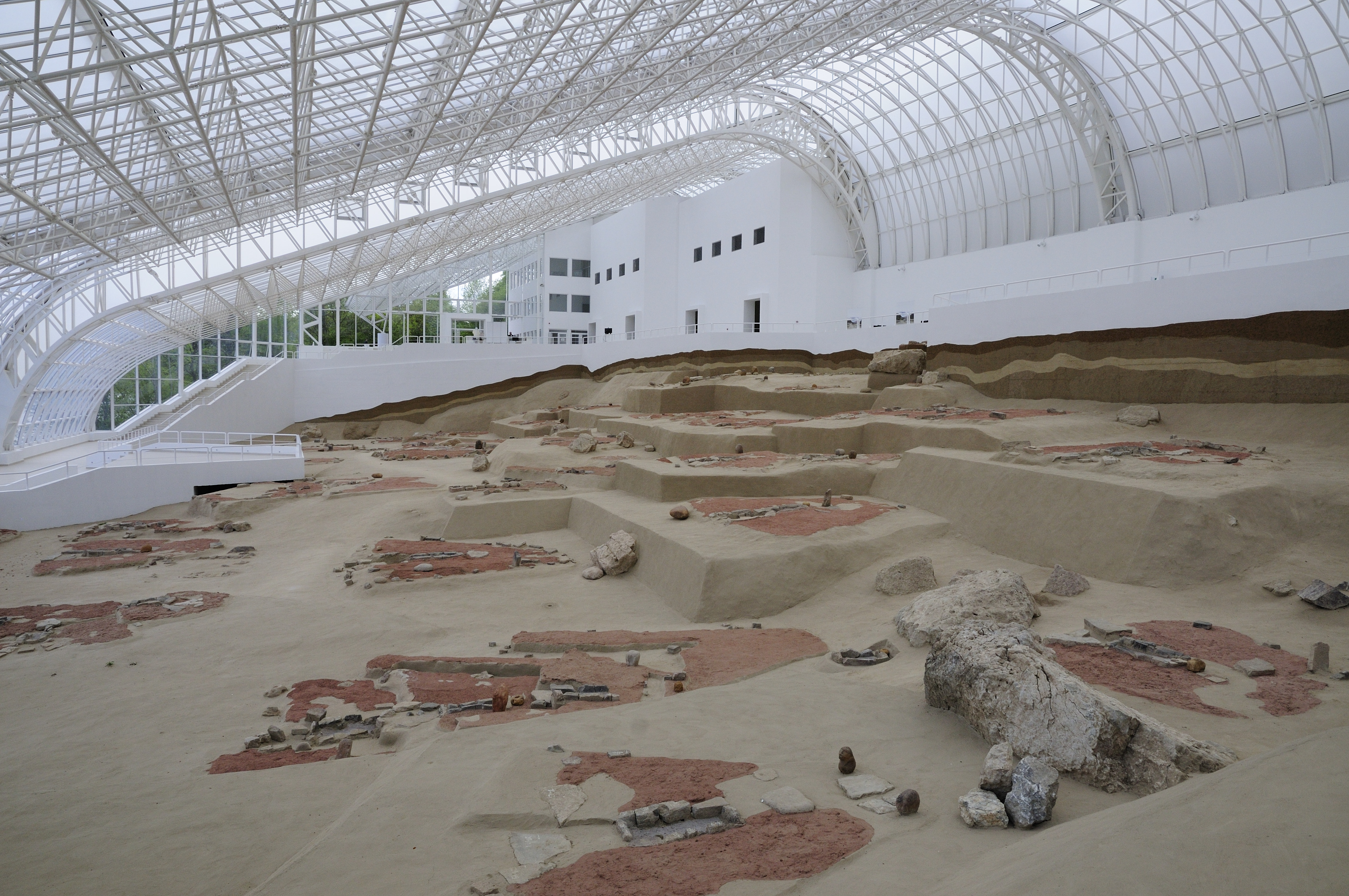
Lepenski Vir, Iron Gates culture, 9500–6000 BCE

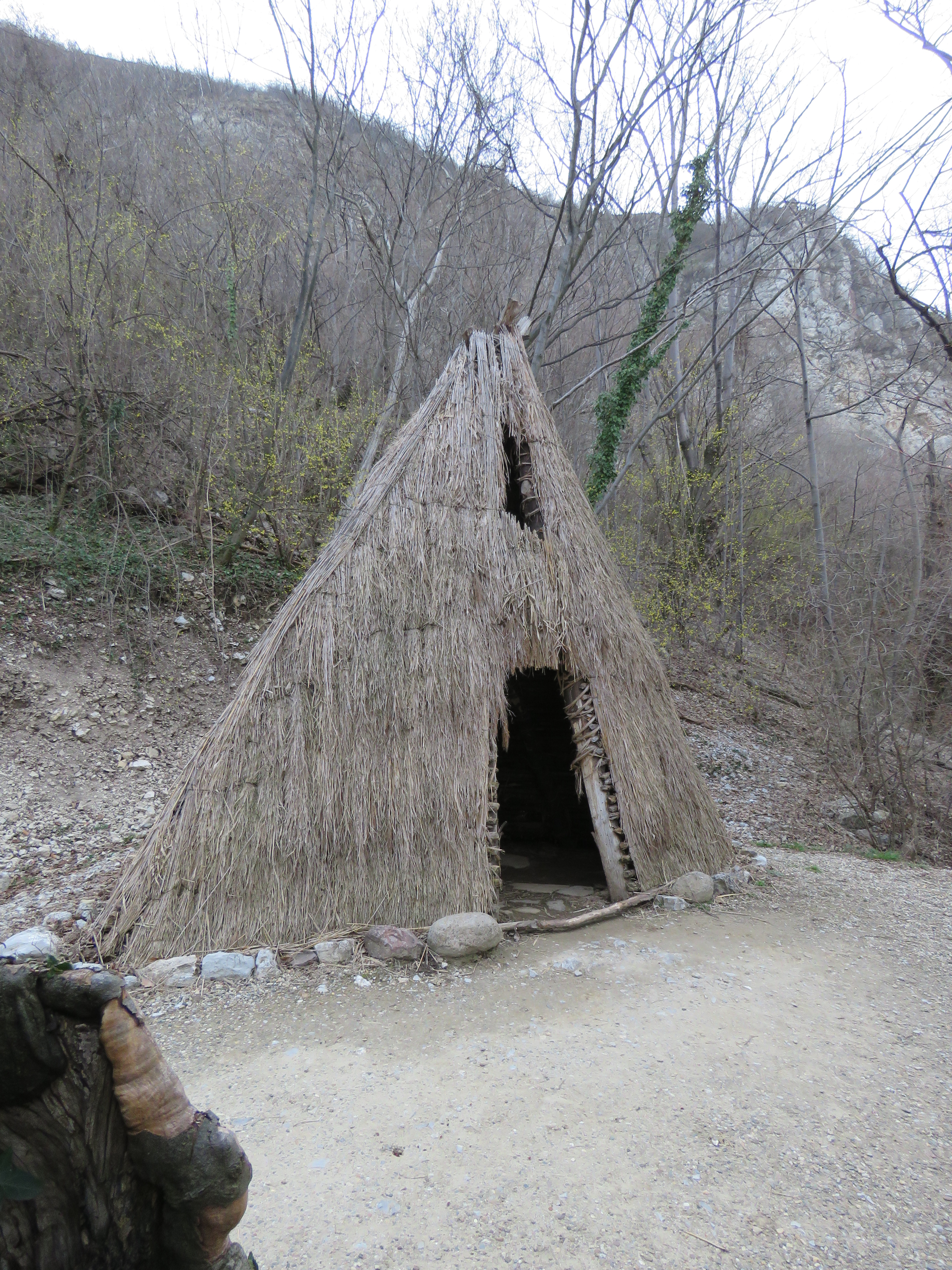
Replica of Lepenski Vir houses

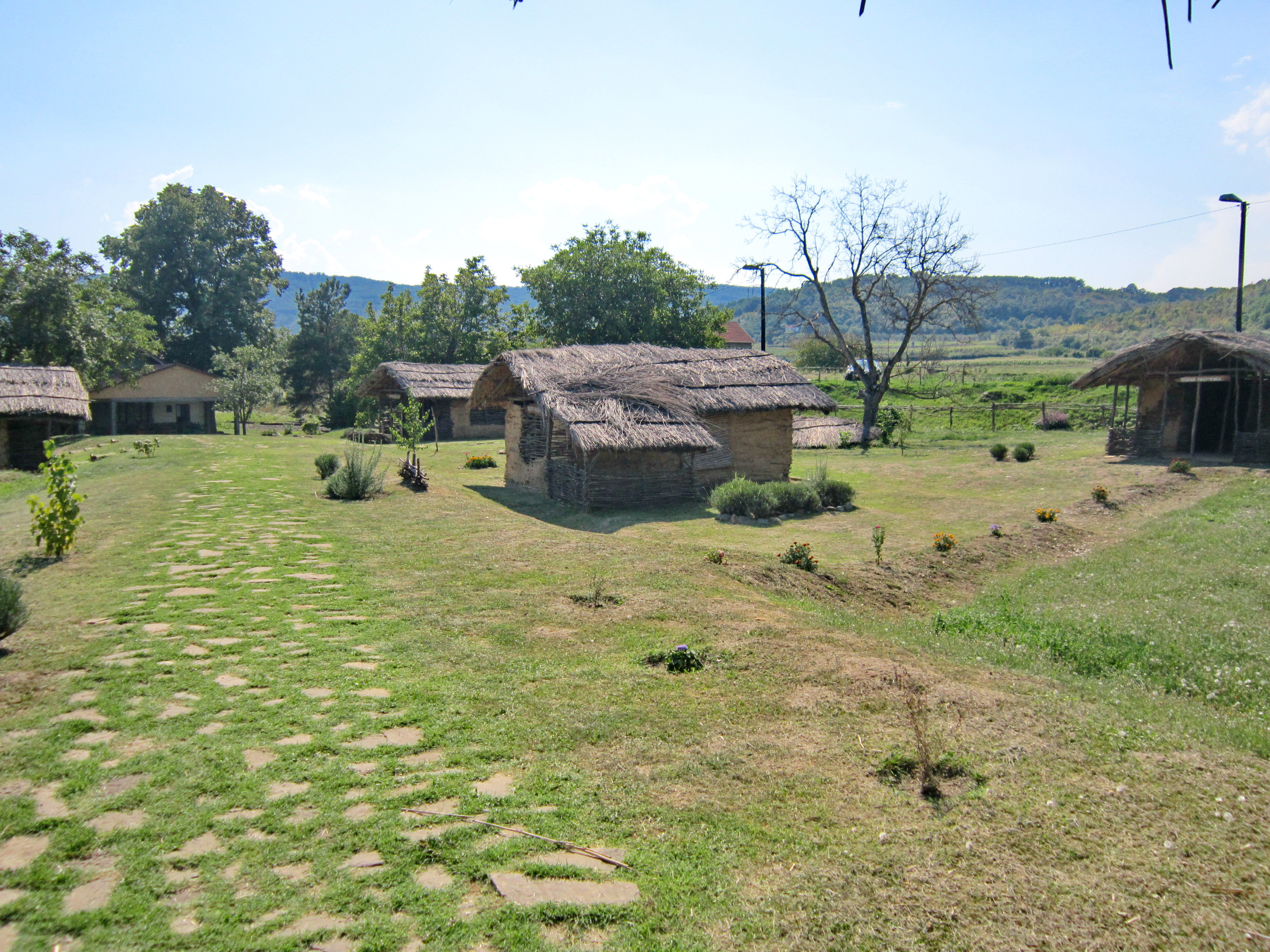
Pločnik, Vinča culture, 5500–4700 BCE

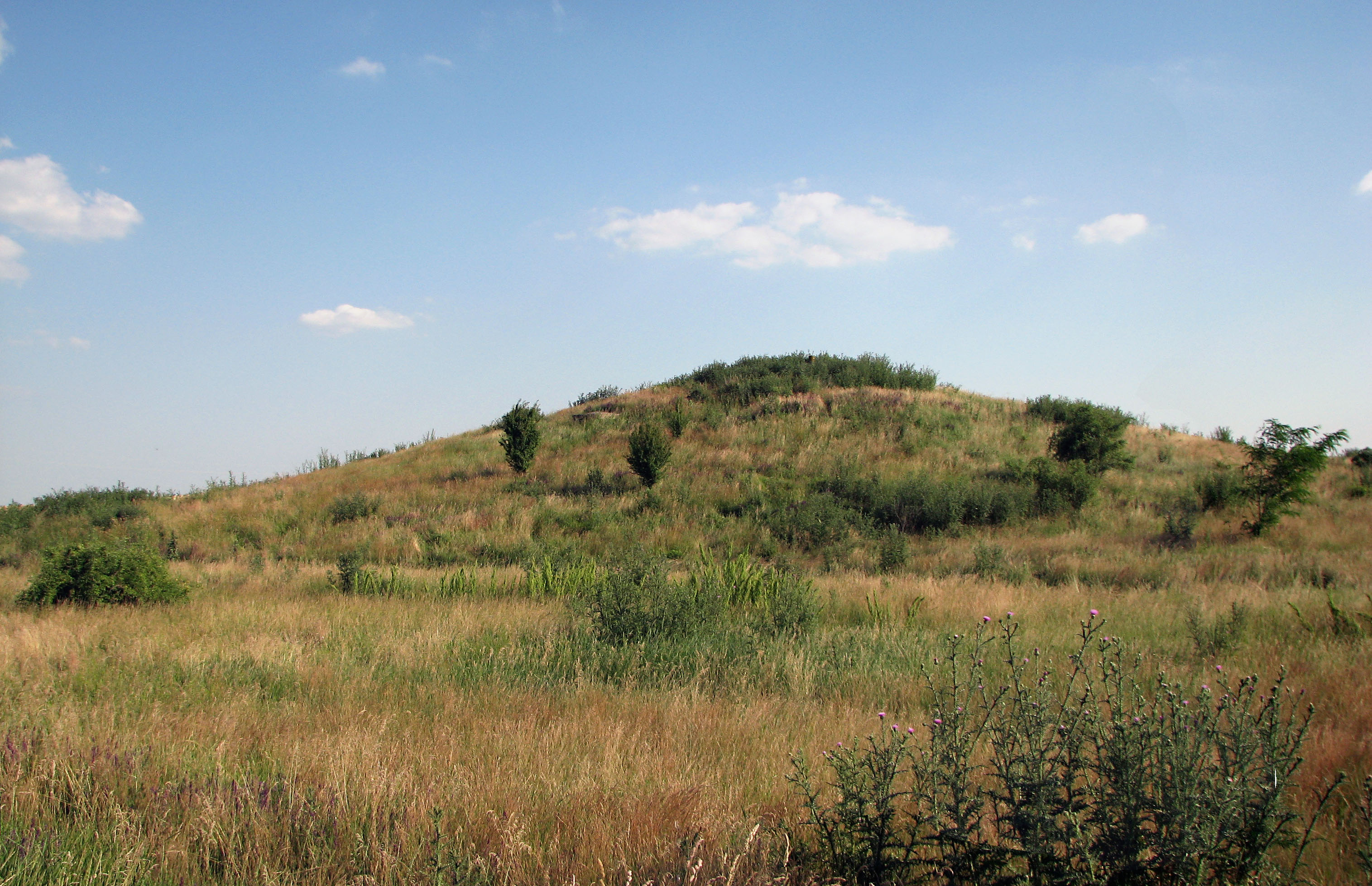
Kurgan mount near Novi Kneževac, 3000 BCE

== Ancient period ==
The northernmost Ancient Macedonian town was Kale-Krševica, which still today have the foundations of the Ancient Greek 5th-century BC town. The Scordisci built the stone fortress of Singidunum, the Kalemegdan at Belgrade in the 3rd century BC, It has since been built on by Romans, Serbs, Turks, Austrians and show an example of continuing 2,300-year-old architecture, serving as one of the best landmarks in Belgrade.

The Romans left many traces of their six centuries of rule in the Serbian lands, including several fortifications and complexes such as the 3rd century AD Imperial palace of Galerius at Gamzigrad (Felix Romuliana) that was built at his birthplace after the victory against the Persians, the Mediana site in Niš (Naissus) from the 4th century and the Dardania capital, the ruins of the Moesia Superior capital Viminacium, former Roman capital and birthplace of several Roman Emperors Sirmium, and Byzantine city Justiniana Prima built by Justinian I, which was the seat of the Archbishopric of Justiniana Prima, Justiniana Secunda, Remesiana, Gratiana etc.

Roman, and later Byzantine architecture would inspire architecture of medieval Serbia, especially fortifications and religious buildings.

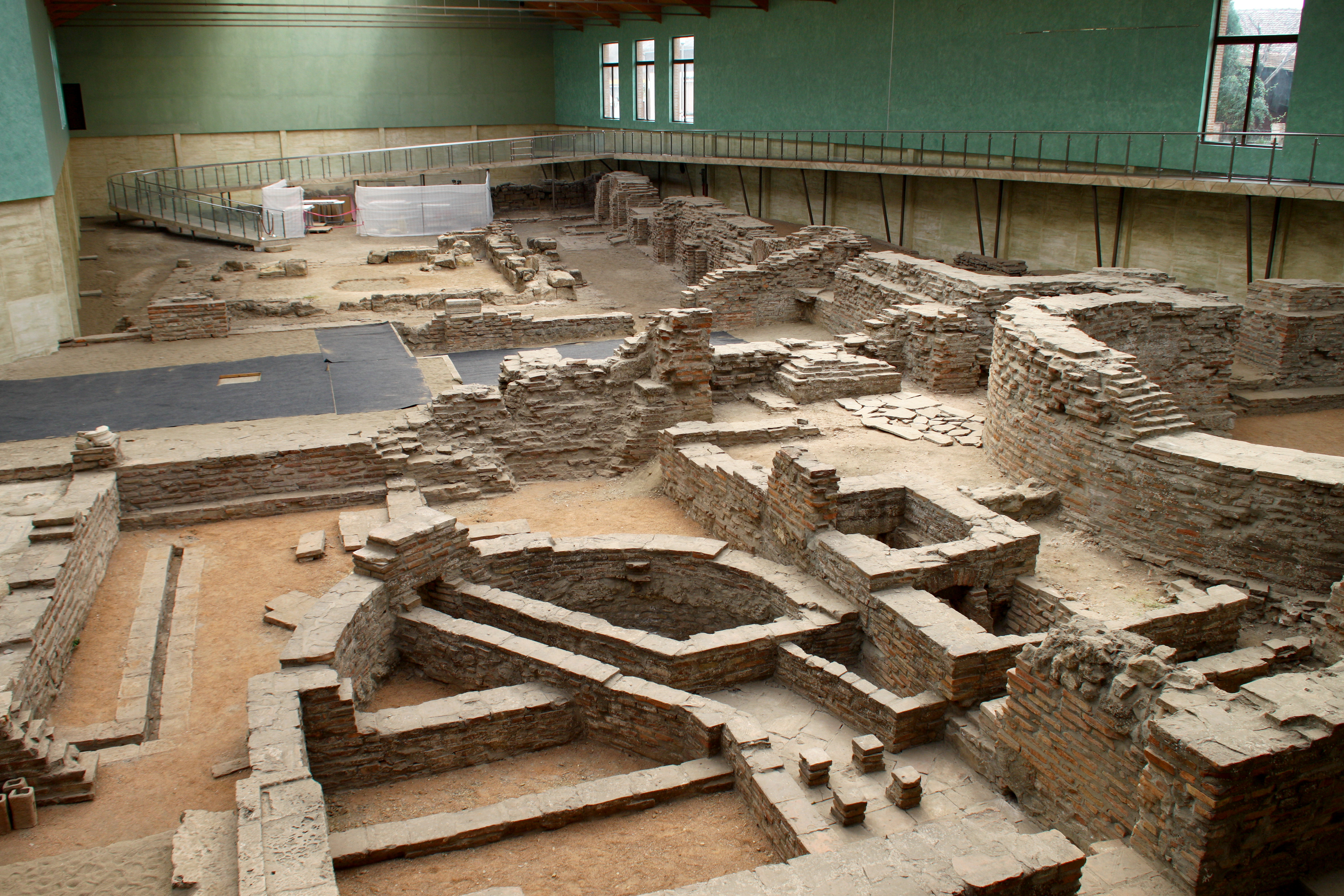
Sirmium was proclaimed one of four capitals of the Roman Empire and it was also the capital of the Praetorian prefecture of Illyricum and of Pannonia Secunda

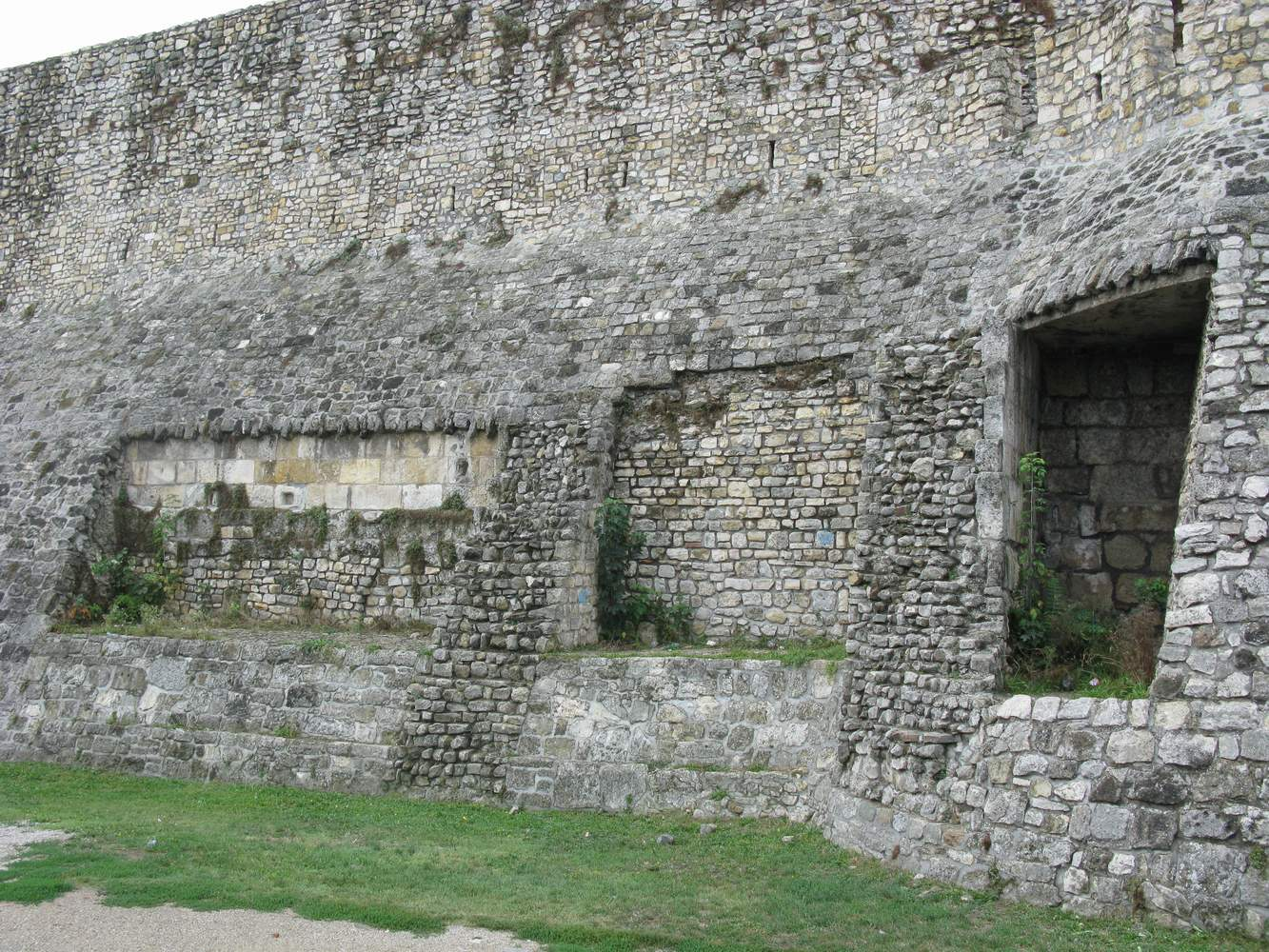
Singidunum Roman city remains at Fortress in Belgrade

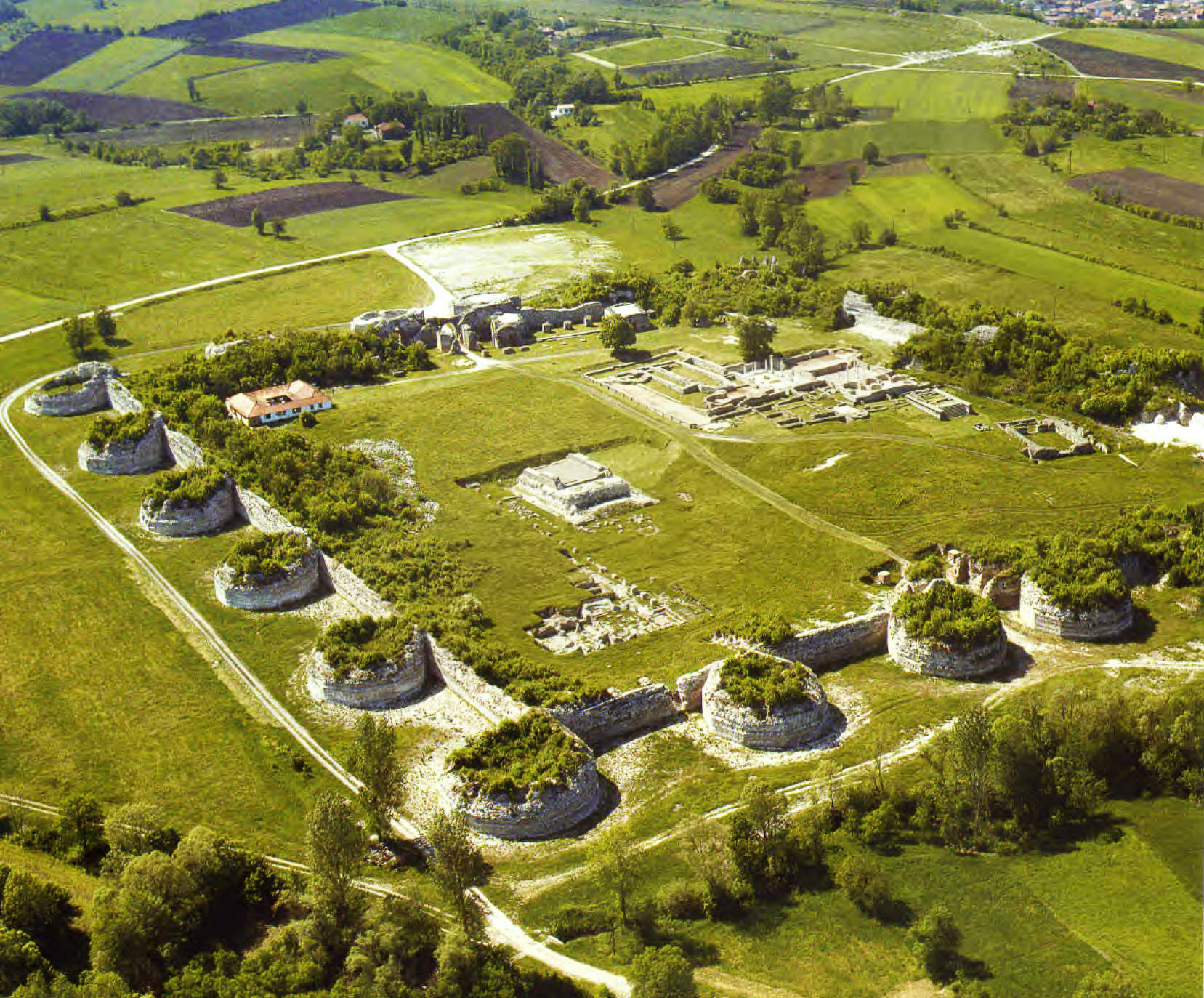
Felix Romuliana near Zaječar, UNESCO World Heritage Site

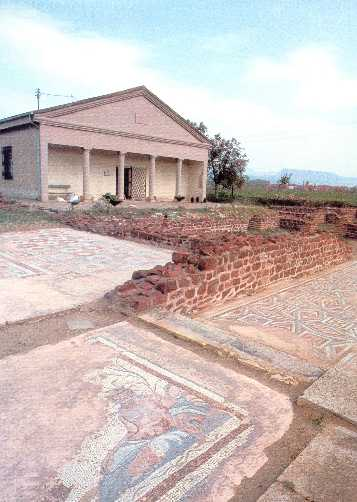
Mediana in Niš

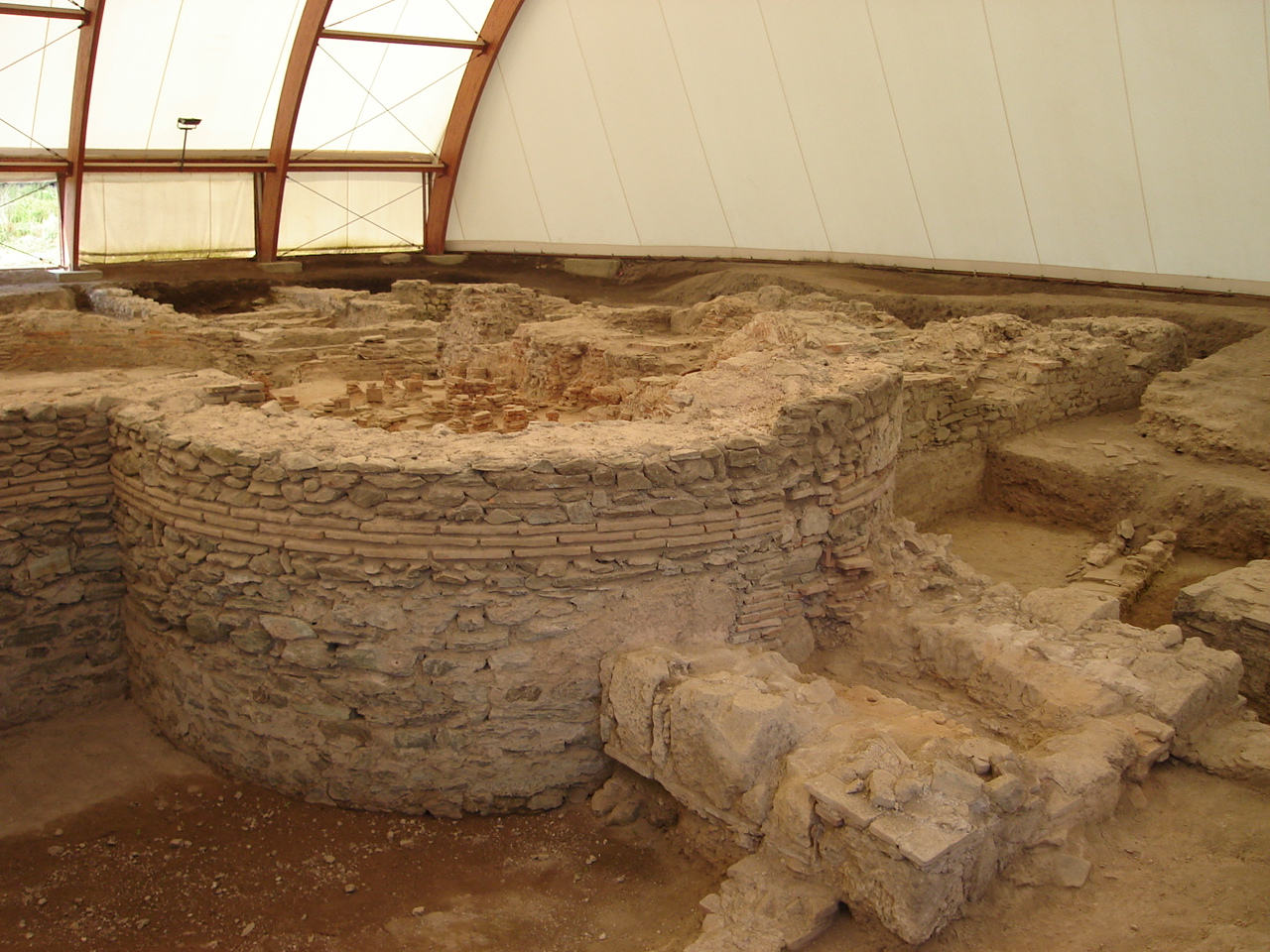
Viminacium thermae ruins near Kostolac

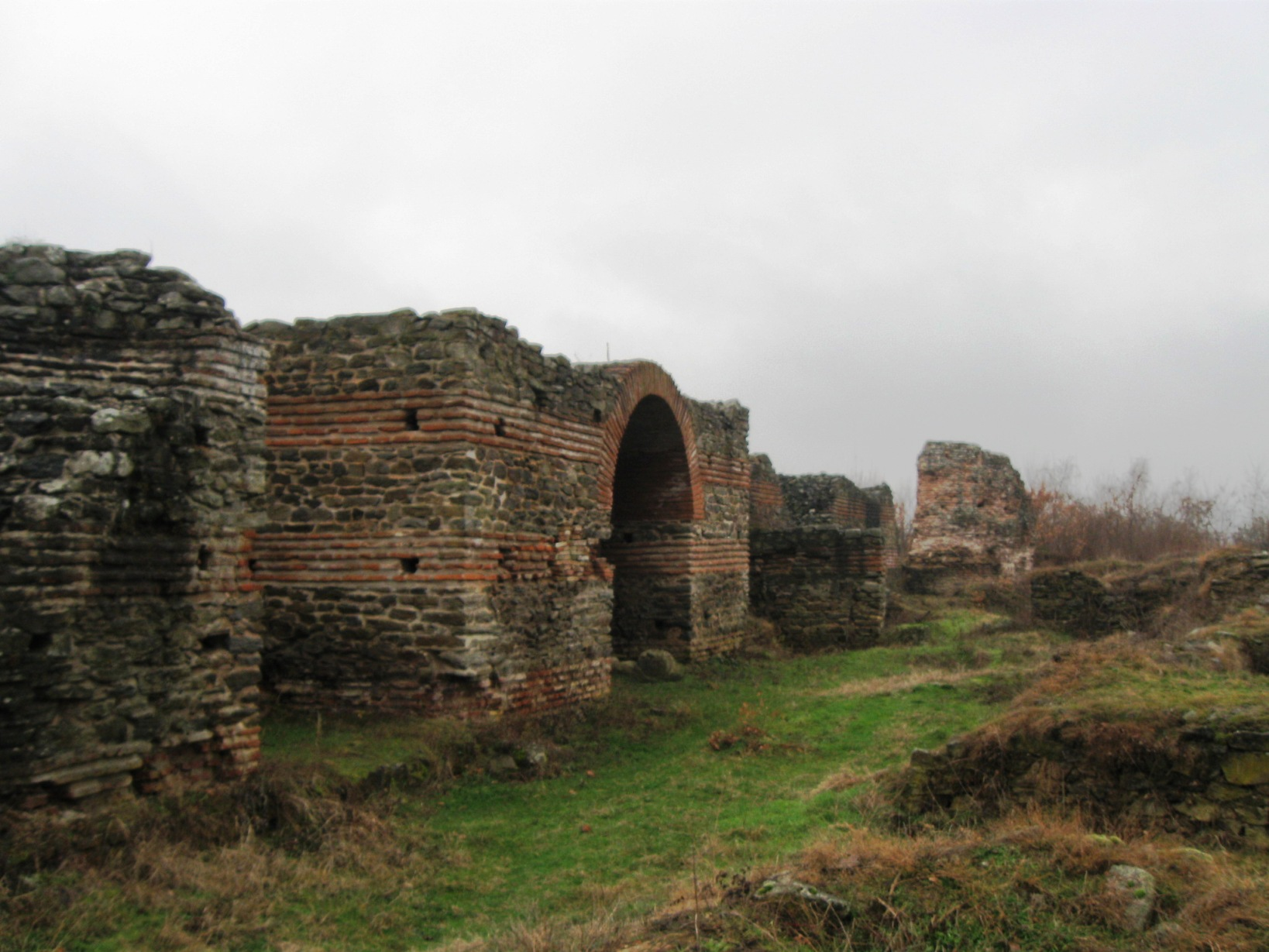
Justiniana Prima near Lebane

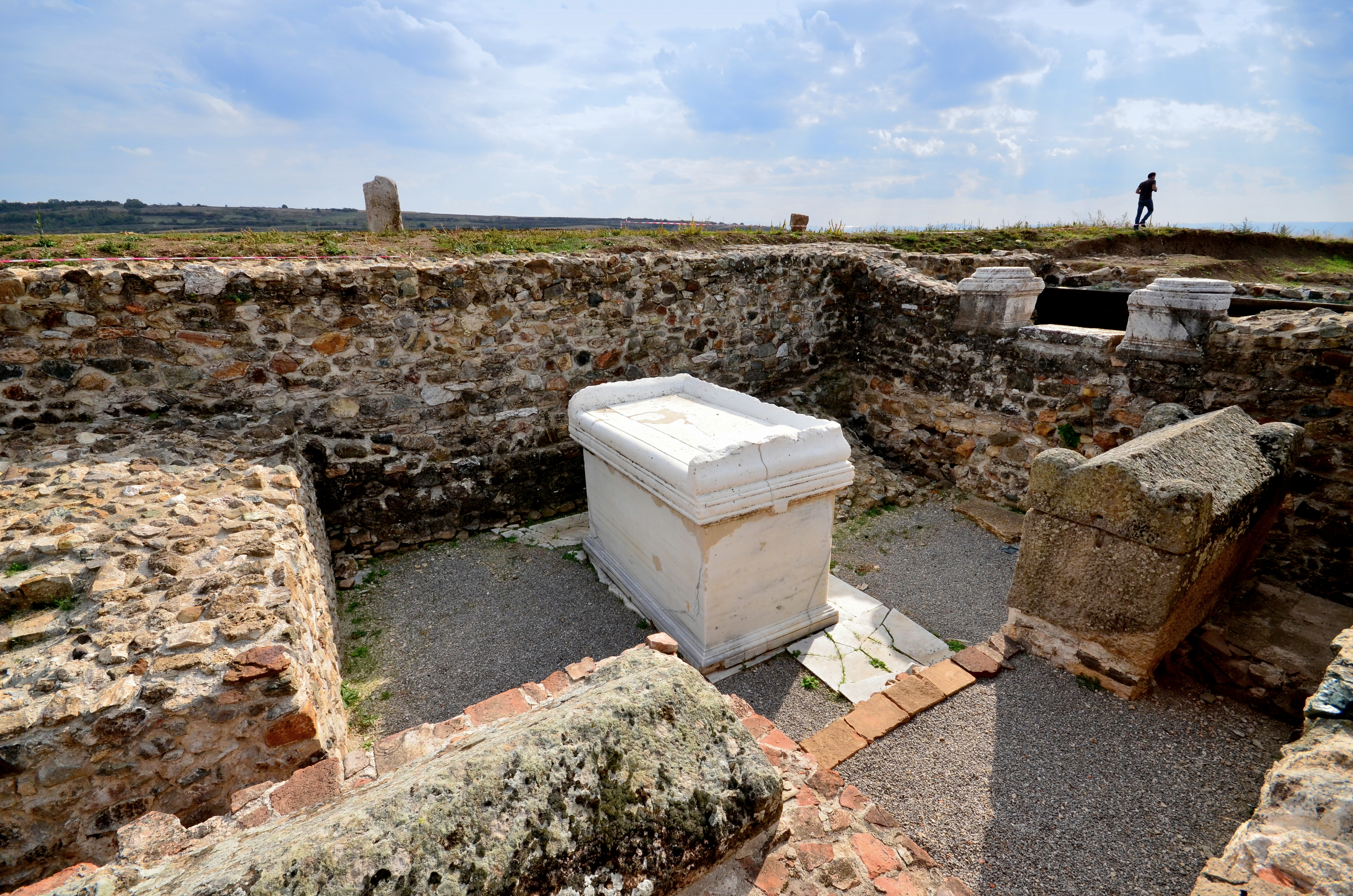
Justiniana Secunda near Lipjan

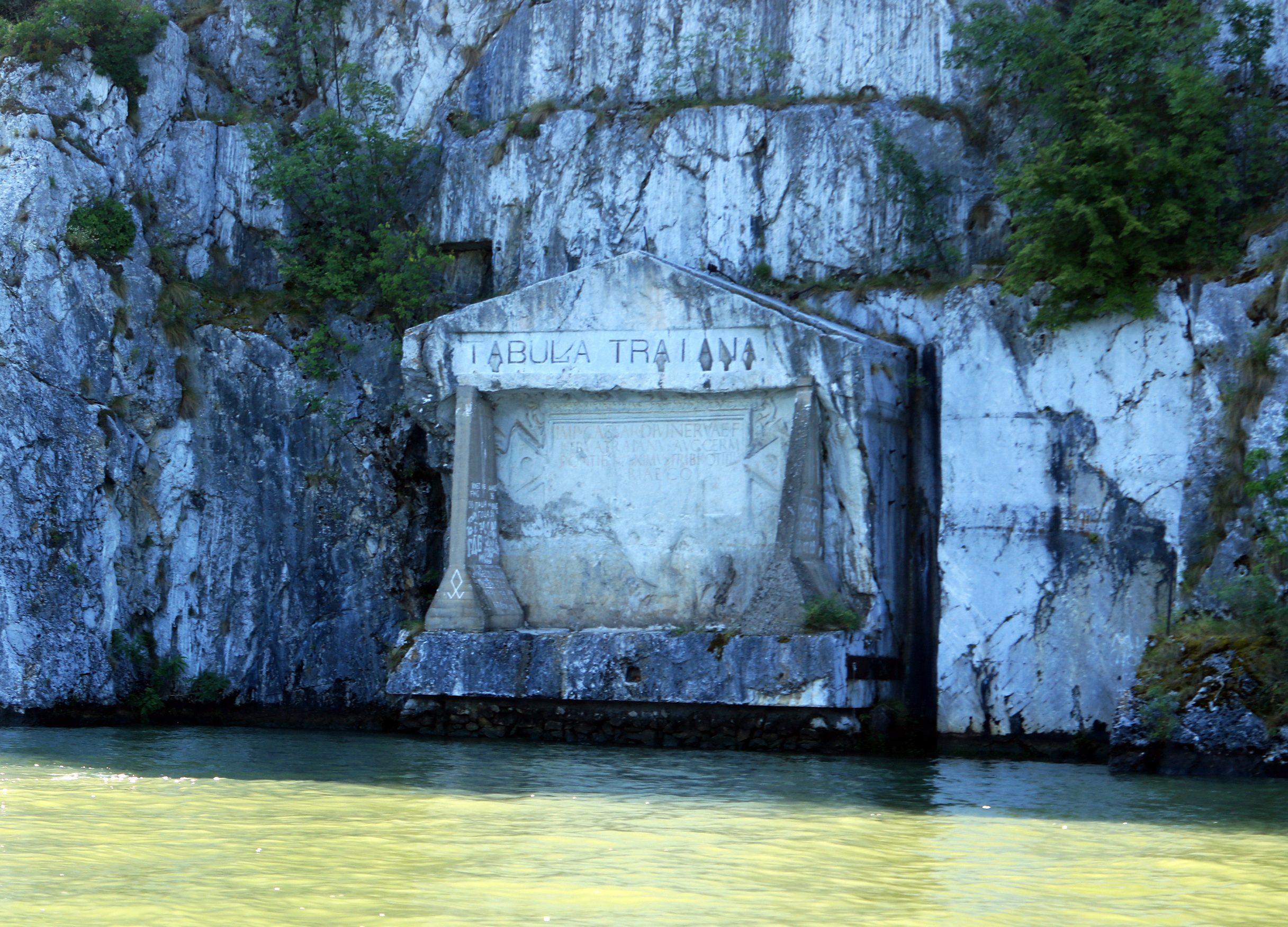
Tabula Traiana near Trajan's Bridge

== Medieval period ==
Medieval period between the 8th and 15th century showcased the most turbulent and wide array of architectural styles and building constructions. The emergence of the Kingdom of Serbia (and other Serb medieval states), subsequent Empire, and fall under Byzanties, Ottomans and Habsburgs would leave an everlasting impact in Serbian and Serb culture and the architecture build then and afterwards. From romanesque, to gothic, Ottoman, Byzantine, moorish and local styles (Raška, Vardar, Morava), this period laid the foundations for future historic revival styles, as well as Serbia's own national architectural style. The territories of medieval Serbia would often shift during this period, which would leave many Serb architectural works in Bosnia and Herzegovina, Montenegro, North Macedonia, and parts of Albania, Bulgaria, Croatia, Greece, Hungary, and Romania.

The legacy of medieval Serbian architecture is evident through churches, monasteries, fortresses, and castles preserved despite the turbulent history. While very few folk and vernacular buildings survived from the medieval period, their trace influences can be seen through the many vernacular buildings constructed in the modernity period.

=== Medieval Christian architecture ===
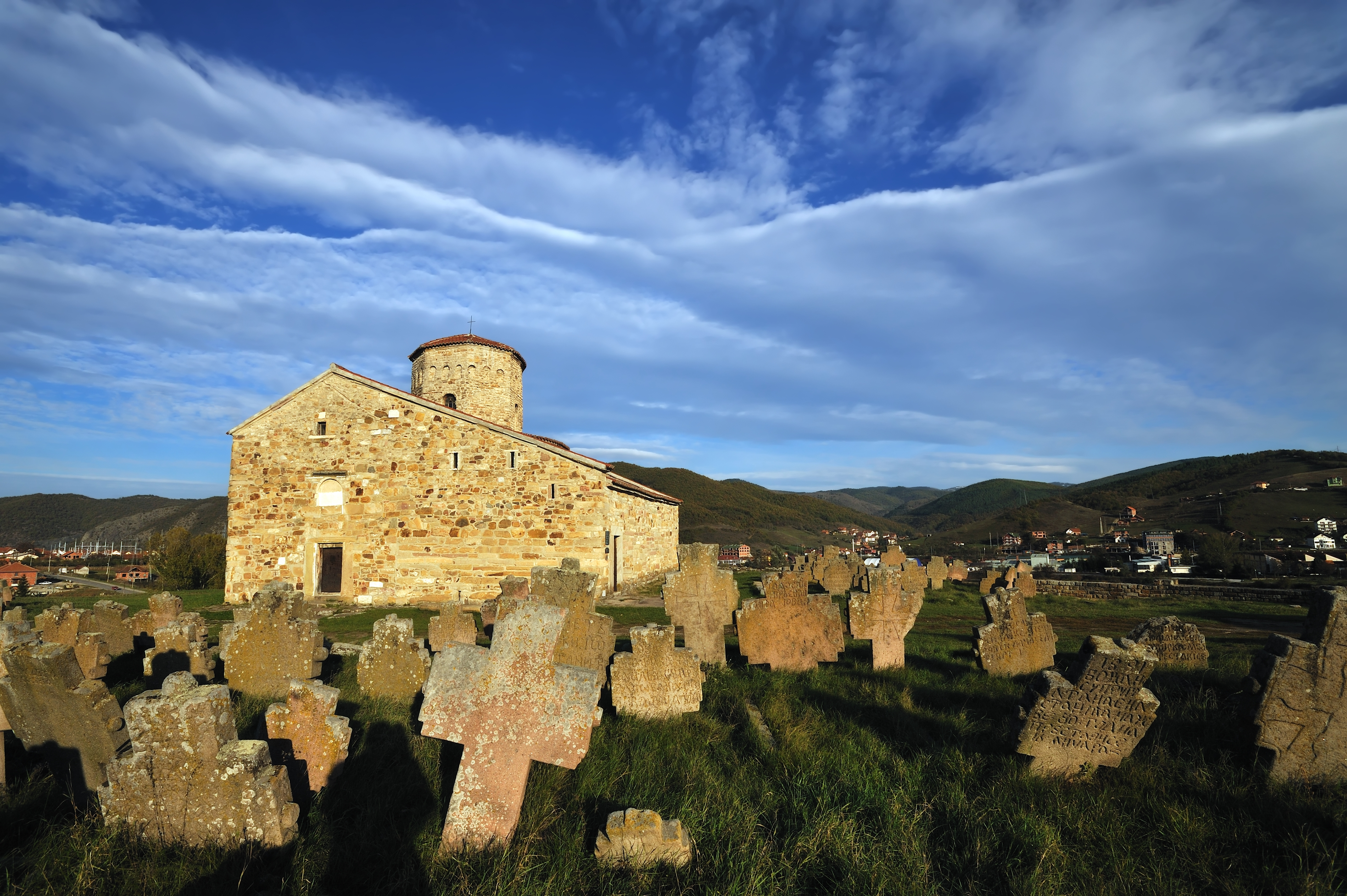
Church of the Holy Apostles Peter and Paul by Romanus IV in Novi Pazar, UNESCO World Heritage Site, 1067–1071

Church of the Holy Apostles Peter and Paul is one of the few remaining building from early Middle Ages and UNESCO World Cultural Heritage site. Prohor Pčinjski Monastery was founded 1067–1071 by the Byzantine emperor Romanus IV in honor of Saint Prohor of Pčinja.

Church architecture mostly developed under the patronage of the Serbian state, with rarely any mentions of what specific architect and engineer designed the church building (records of specific fresco artists remain). The most distinctive piece of medieval Serbian architecture was the Studenica monastery founded by Stefan Nemanja, the founder of Nemanjić dynasty in c. 1190. This monastery also featured significant works of art including its Byzantine style fresco paintings. Its church also features extensive sculptures based on Psalms and the Dormition of the Theotokos. UNESCO added this monastery to its list of World Cultural Heritage sites in 1986. It was the model for other monasteries at Mileševa, Sopoćani and the Visoki Dečani.

The influence of Byzantine art became more influential after the capture of Constantinople in 1204 in the Fourth Crusade when many Greek artists fled to Serbia. Their influence can be seen at the Church of the Ascension at Mileševa as well as in the wall paintings at the Church of the Holy Apostles at Peć and at the Sopoćani Monastery. Icons also formed a significant part of church art.

Several ecclesiastical schools emerged during the Middle Ages. Raška and Vardar styles were heavily influenced by romanesque and Byzantine styles, while Morava style was influenced by Vardar style, with distinctive Serbian design elements.

Western European gothic and romanesque church architecture can be seen mostly in the southern parts of Serbia.

Early signs of renaissance can be seen during Stefan Lazarević reign through his Resava School and the Morava architectural style, but would quickly be snuffed out when the Ottomans took full control of Serbian lands, with no clear examples of renaissance architecture present in Serbia until historic revival movements in the modernity period.

==== Raška Style ====
Raška architectural school in Serbian architecture during the Middle Ages, covers the period from the seventh decade of the 12th to the end of the 13th century, with Stefan Nemanja's Đurđevi stupovi (around 1170) being taken as the starting points of the style, and Stefan Dragutin's Church of St. Achillius (around 1296) as the end point. However, this border is only indicative because there are later ecclesiastical objects that belong to another style, but are architecturally constructed in Raška style, such as the monastery churches of Visoki Dečani and Banjska, which were erected in the first half of the 14th century and at a time when the Vardar style dominated. The style itself was named after the Raška river, where the then Kingdom of Serbia gravitated around. A large example of these Raška style churches and monasteries are also located in Montenegro and Bosnia and Herzegovina.

The basic characteristic of this style is a single-nave basilica, single-drum dome structure. On the west side, there is usually a narthex, while on the south and north, there are lower wards, usually transepts and parecclesions (or apse). The external designs of the church buildings were done in romanesque style, indicating direct links with the seaside, Adriatic coastal towns (Kotor, Dubrovnik and others), which were under Nemanjić's control at the time, with the windows and portals done in a gothic style. The so-called golden age of Serbian painting, which began with the fresco painting of Đurđevi stupovi around 1175 and ended with Gradac around 1275, culminates with Sopoćani. After this period, the so-called Vardar style with its frescoes, developed under the influence of the Palaiologos Renaissance.

Many Raška styled churches and monasteries would have elements of their design altered over time. Studenica, Žiča, Gradac for example had their designs noticeably altered, ether due to natural disasters or pillages, requiring extensive repairs and restorations to the structures, or general alterations to the original designs through the building's expansion. Most noticeable alterations to the designs are visible with the drum dome structures, commonly altered into ether the original or revival Serbo-Byzantine styles. Hilandar Monastery at Mount Athos originally had a church built by Stefan Nemanja in the Raška style, which would later by replaced by King Uroš II Milutin with the Vardar styled Church of Entrance of the Theotokos.

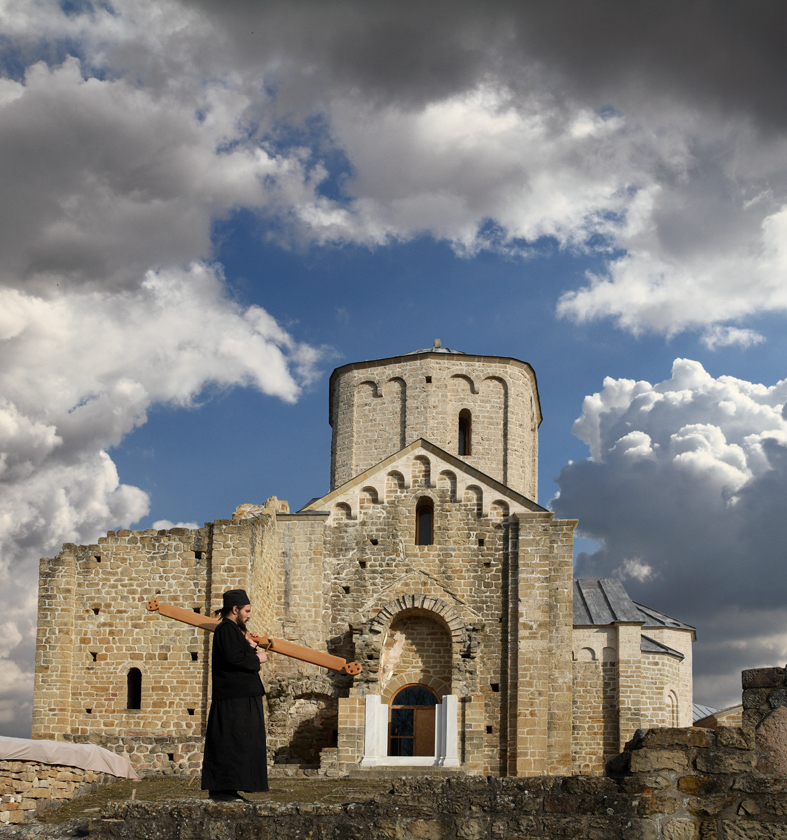
Đurđevi stupovi monastery by Grand Prince Stefan Nemanja I Vukanović near Novi Pazar UNESCO World Heritage Site, 1166

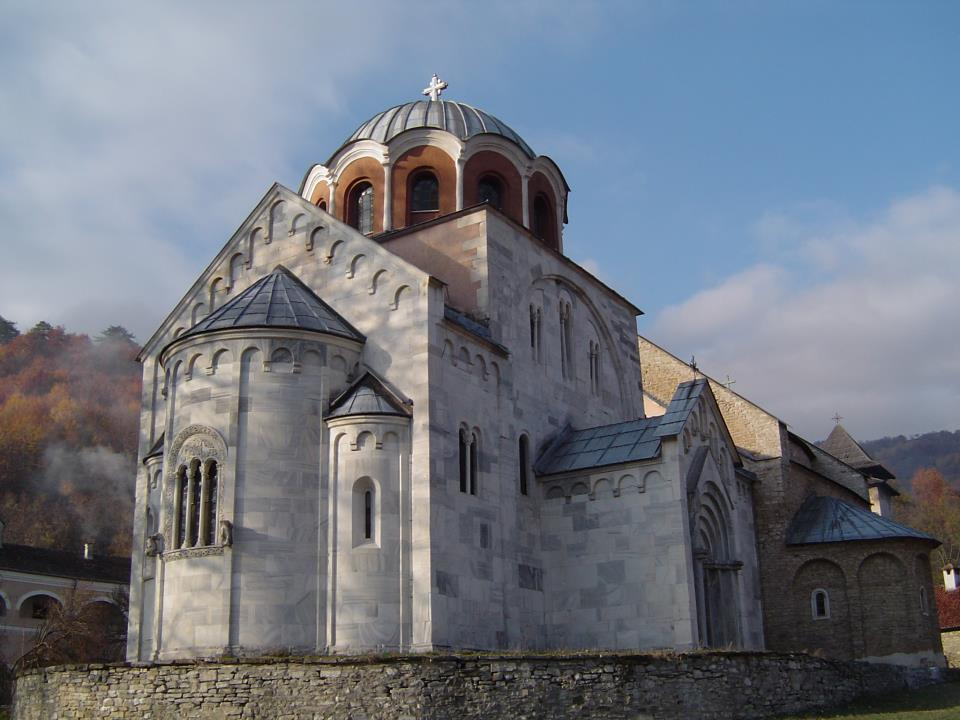
Studenica monastery by Grand Prince Stefan Nemanja I Vukanović near Kraljevo, an example of unique medieval Serbian architecture, UNESCO World Heritage Site, 1196

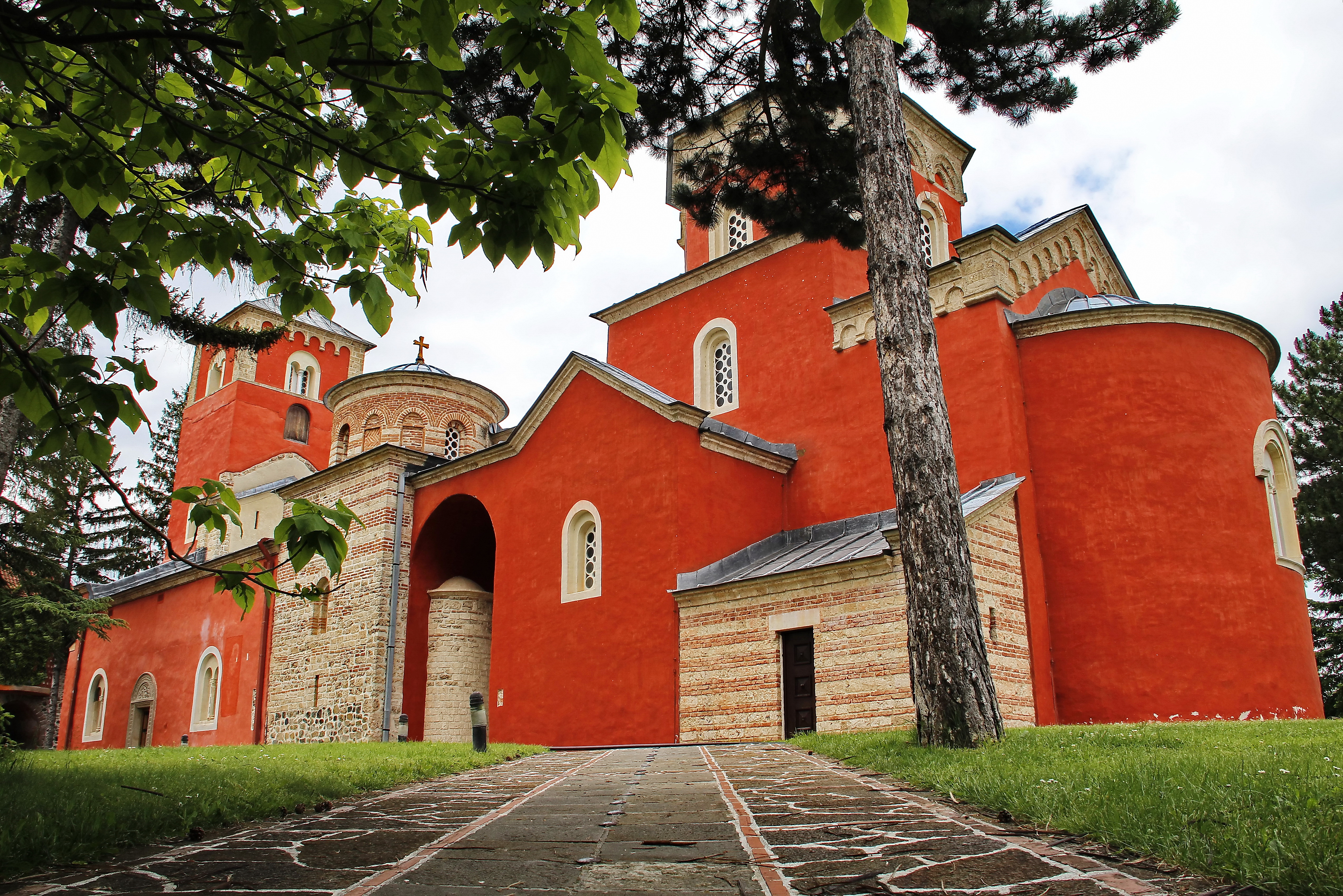
Žiča Monastery by King Stefan Nemanja II Nemanjić near Kraljevo, the coronational site of the Serbian kings, 1207-1217

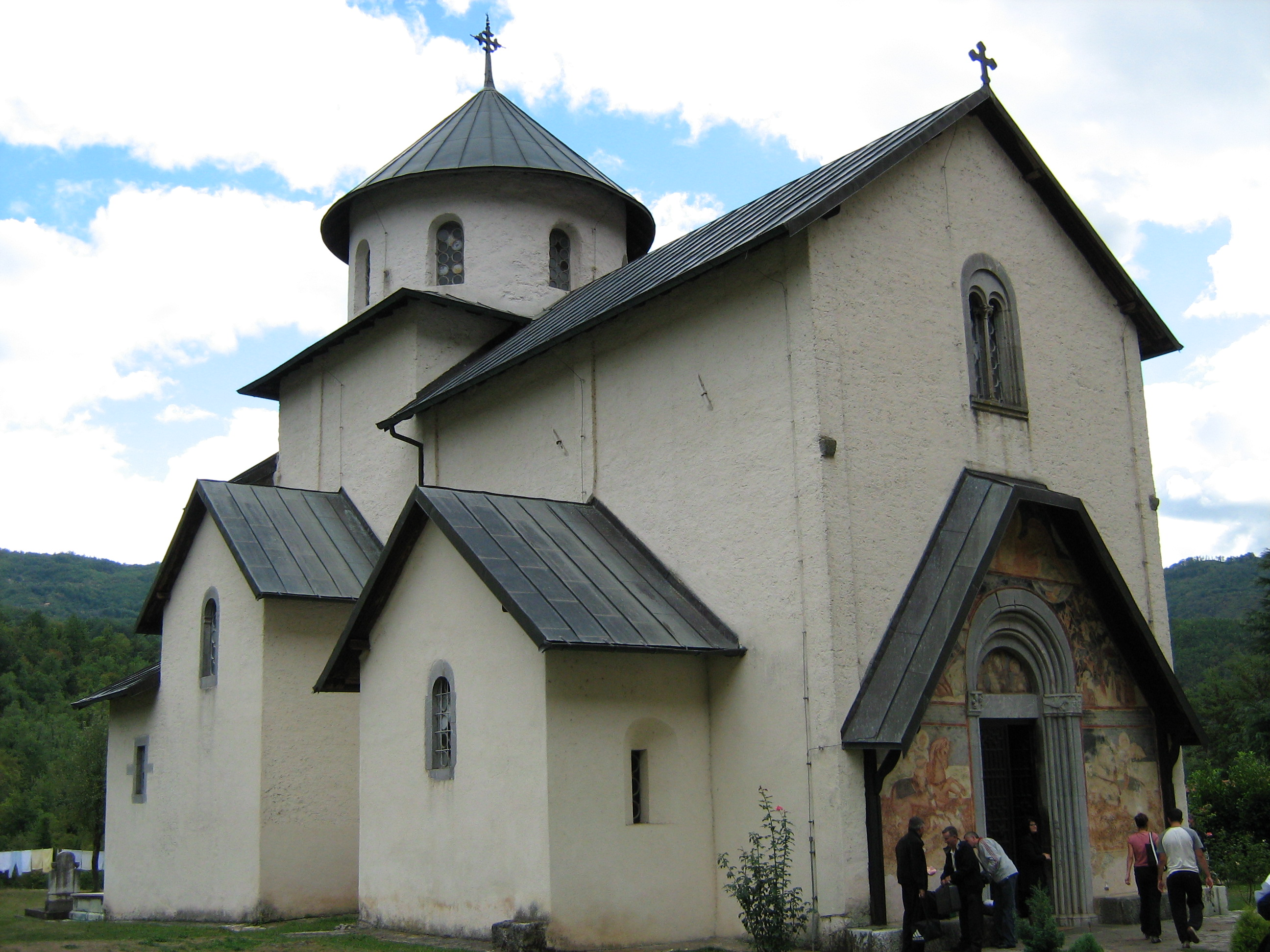
Morača Monastery by Prince Stefan Vukanović Nemanjić in Montenegro, 1252

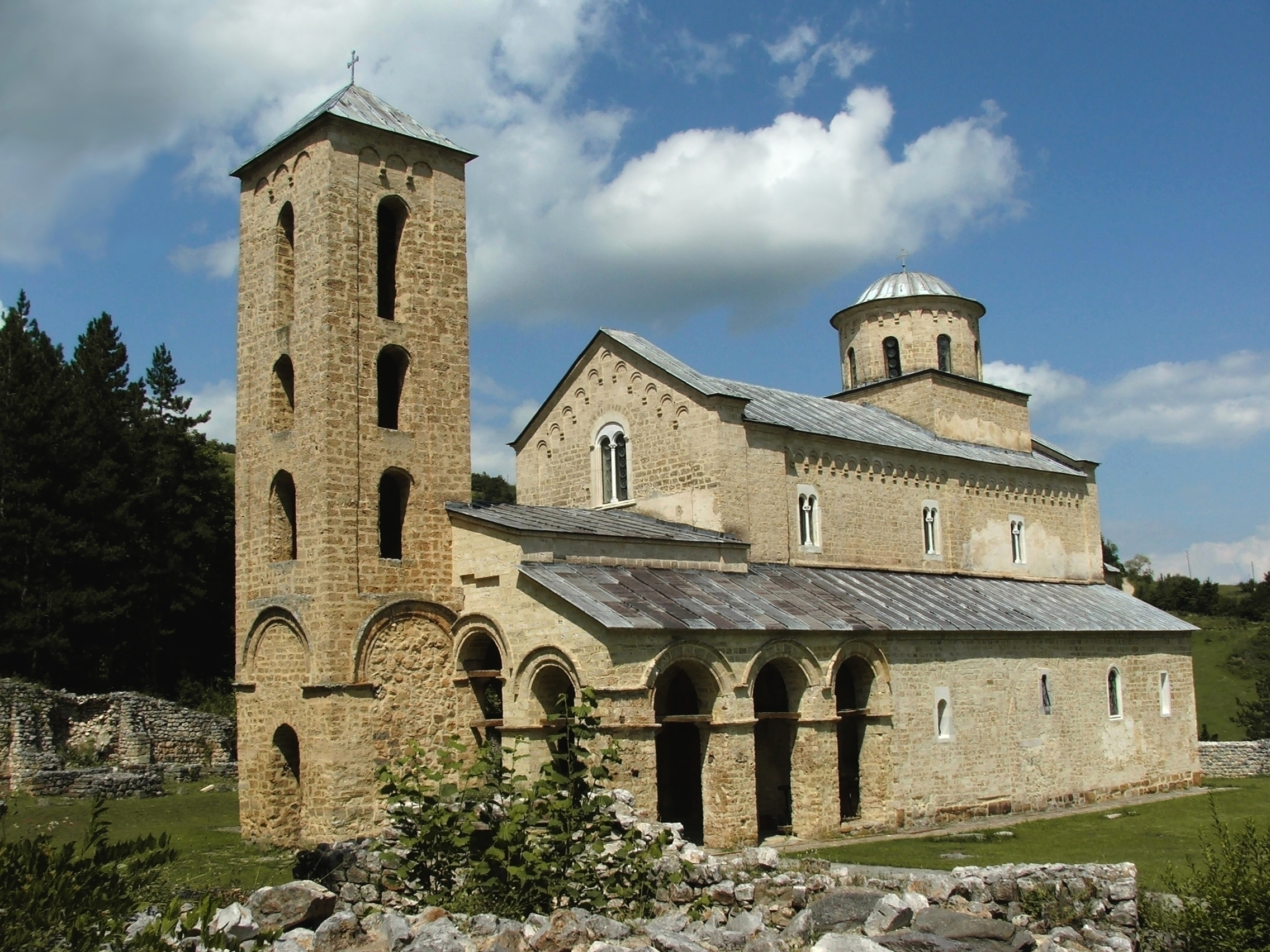
Sopoćani monastery by King Stefan Uroš I Nemanjić at Stari Ras, UNESCO World Heritage Site, 1265

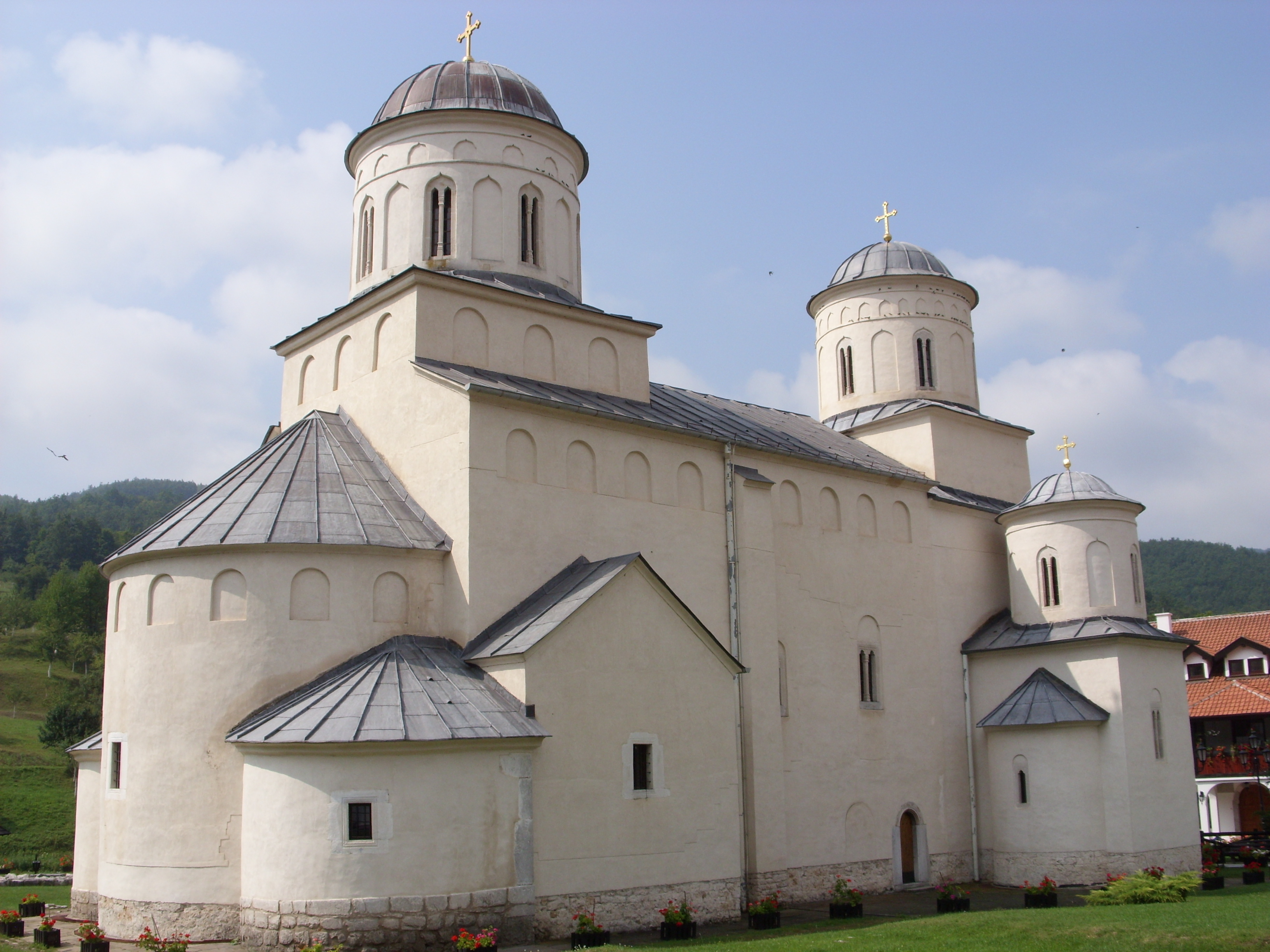
Mileševa monastery by King Stefan Vladislav Nemanjić at Prijepolje, 1236

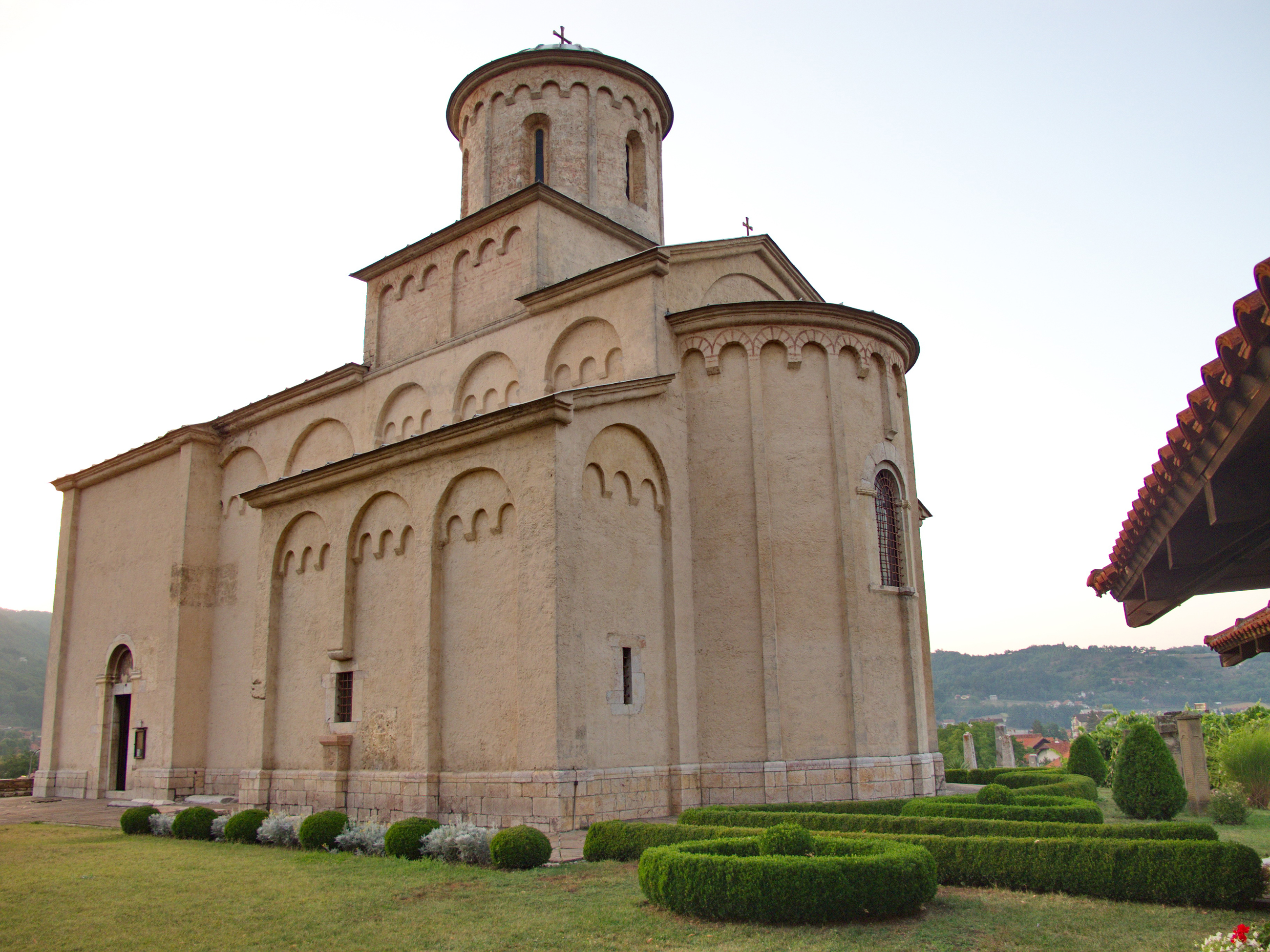
Church of St. Achillius by King Stefan Dragutin Nemanjić in Arilje, 1296

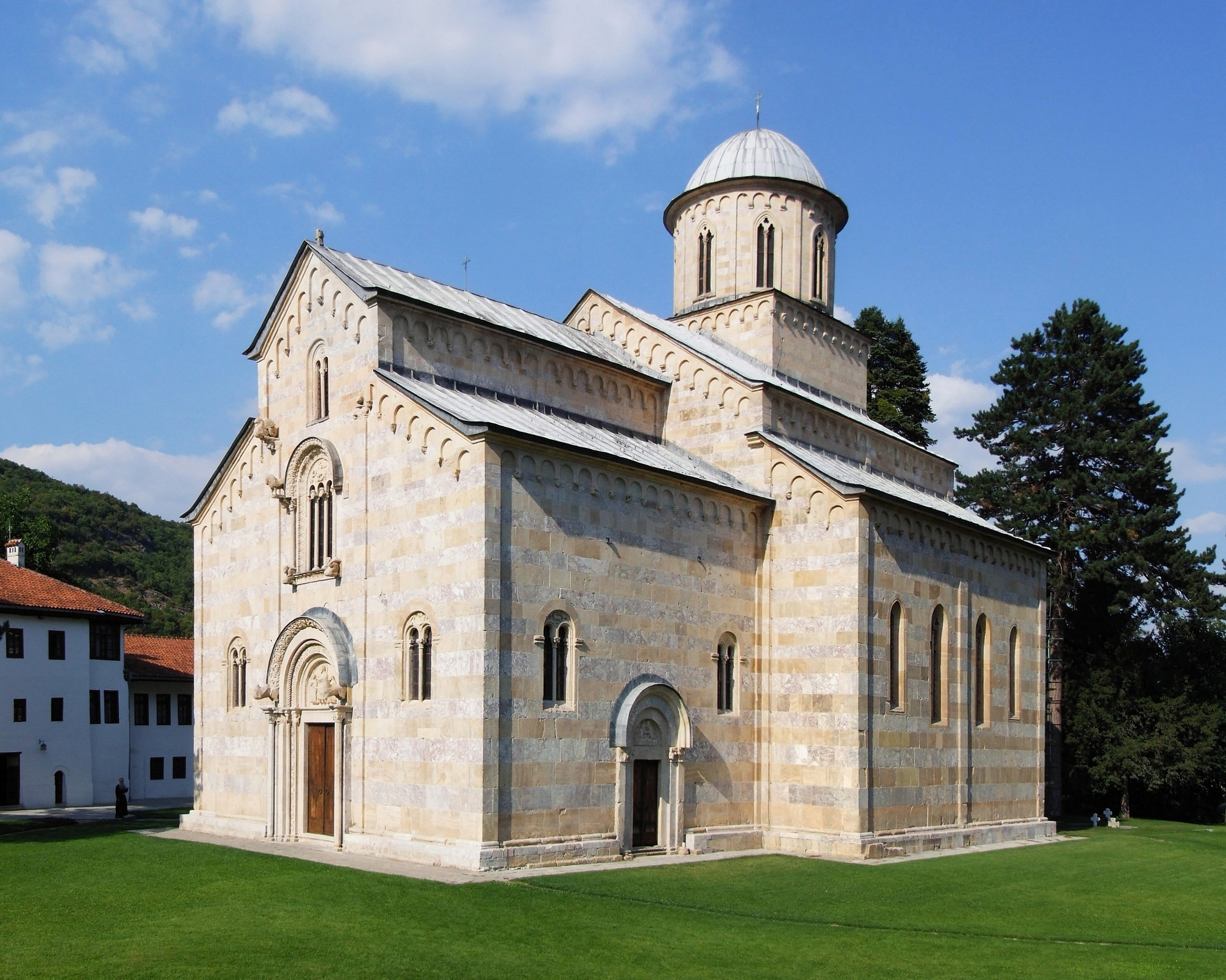
Visoki Dečani monastery by King Stefan Uroš III Dečanski Nemanjić in Dečani, built in the Raška style, UNESCO World Heritage Site, 1327

==== Vardar Style ====
Vardar architectural school, also known as Serbo-Byzantine Style, is an ecclesiastical architectural style that flourished in the Serbian Late Middle Ages, which was developed through fusing contemporary Byzantine architecture (under the influence of the Palaiologos Renaissance) with Raška influences to form a new style. By the end of the 13th and in the first half of the 14th century the Serbian state enlarged over Macedonia, Epirus and Thessaly up to the Aegean Sea. On these new territories Serbian art was even more influenced by the Byzantine art tradition. Most notable Vardar styled churches and monasteries are due to King Stefan Uroš II Milutin, and his wide contribution in ecclesiastic constructions during his reign.

The basic characteristic of this style is the basis in the form of an inscribed cross with one or five domes, while on the west side there is usually a narthex. The external design of church buildings is done in a Byzantine style, which is manifested by the use of grey or yellowish stones and red bricks which are usually arranged so that they create decorative patterns on the façade. Unlike the Raška style and the original fresco painting that accompanied it, the buildings of the Vardar style were decorated with frescoes that were modeled after the Byzantine ones of the period.

Gračanica, which was entirely rebuilt by King Milutin in 1321, is the most beautiful monument of Serbian architecture from the 14th century. The church of this monastery is an example of a construction that achieved the highest degree of architecture not only in the Byzantine form but in the creation of an original and freestyle exceeding its models. The wall creation in steps is one of the basic characteristics of this temple. The Kings's Church in Studenica, characterized as an ideal church, was built in the first decades of the 14th century.

By the end of the third decade of the 14th century the Patriarchate of Peć had finally been shaped. The exterior of the Patriarchate is a vision of shapes characteristic of contemporary Serbian architecture. On the major part of the outer walls paint decoration was used instead of stone relief and brick and stone decoration. A typical Serbo-Byzantine church has a rectangular foundation, with a major dome in the center with smaller domes around the center one. The inside of the church is covered with frescos that illustrate various biblical stories and portrays Serbian saints.

The Monastery of the Holy Archangels in Prizren was founded by the Serbian Emperor Stefan Dušan between 1343 and 1352 on the site of an earlier church, part of the Višegrad fortress complex. It was the burial church for Emperor Dušan, and represented the culmination of the Serbian ecclesiastical architectural style, that led to the birth of the Morava school style.

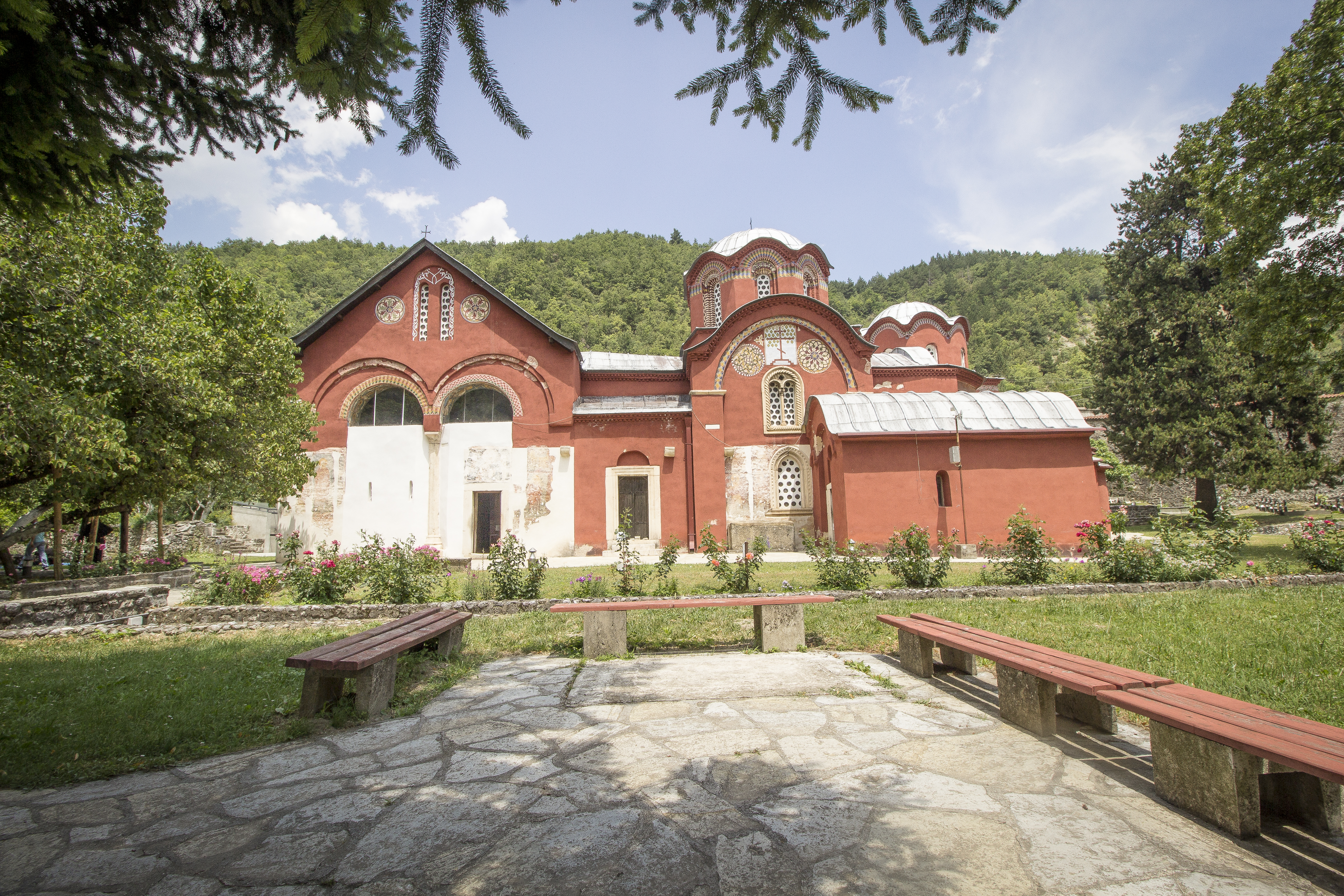
Patriarchate of Peć, the historical residence of Serbian Archbishops, UNESCO World Heritage Site, 13th century

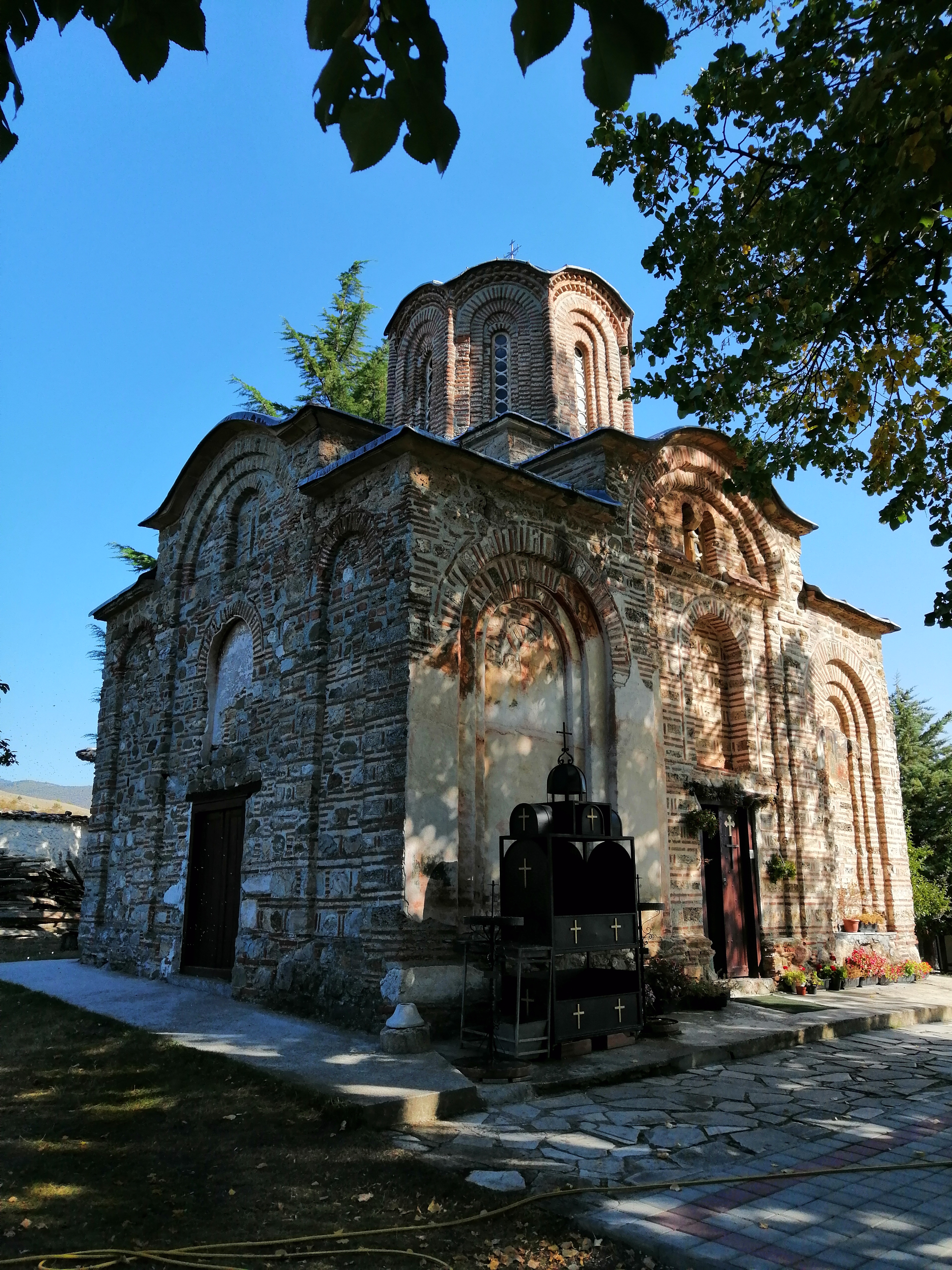
Monastery of St. Nikita in North Macedonia, built before 1307

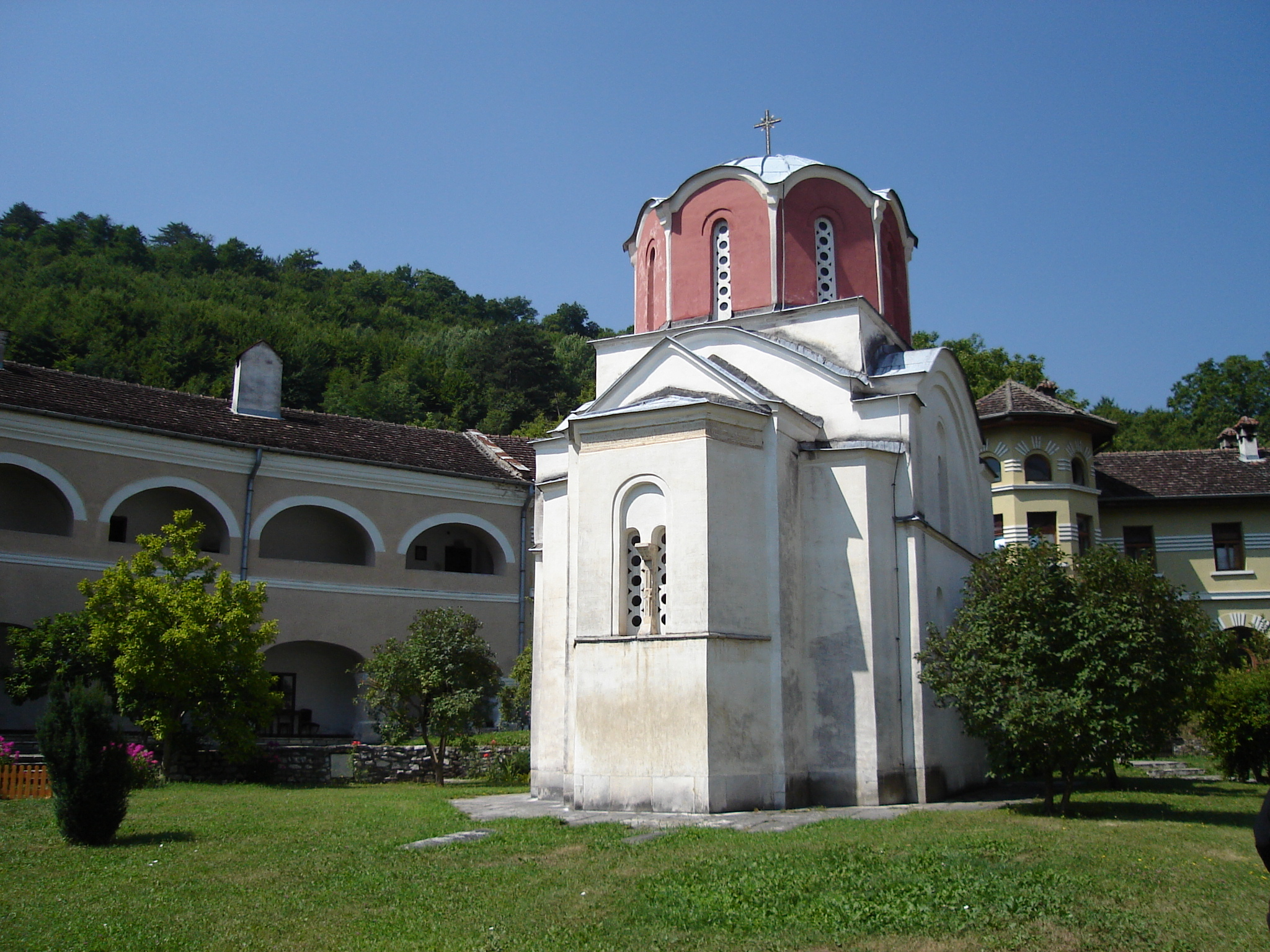
King's Church in Studenica Monastery by King Stefan Uroš II Milutin Nemanjić, 1314

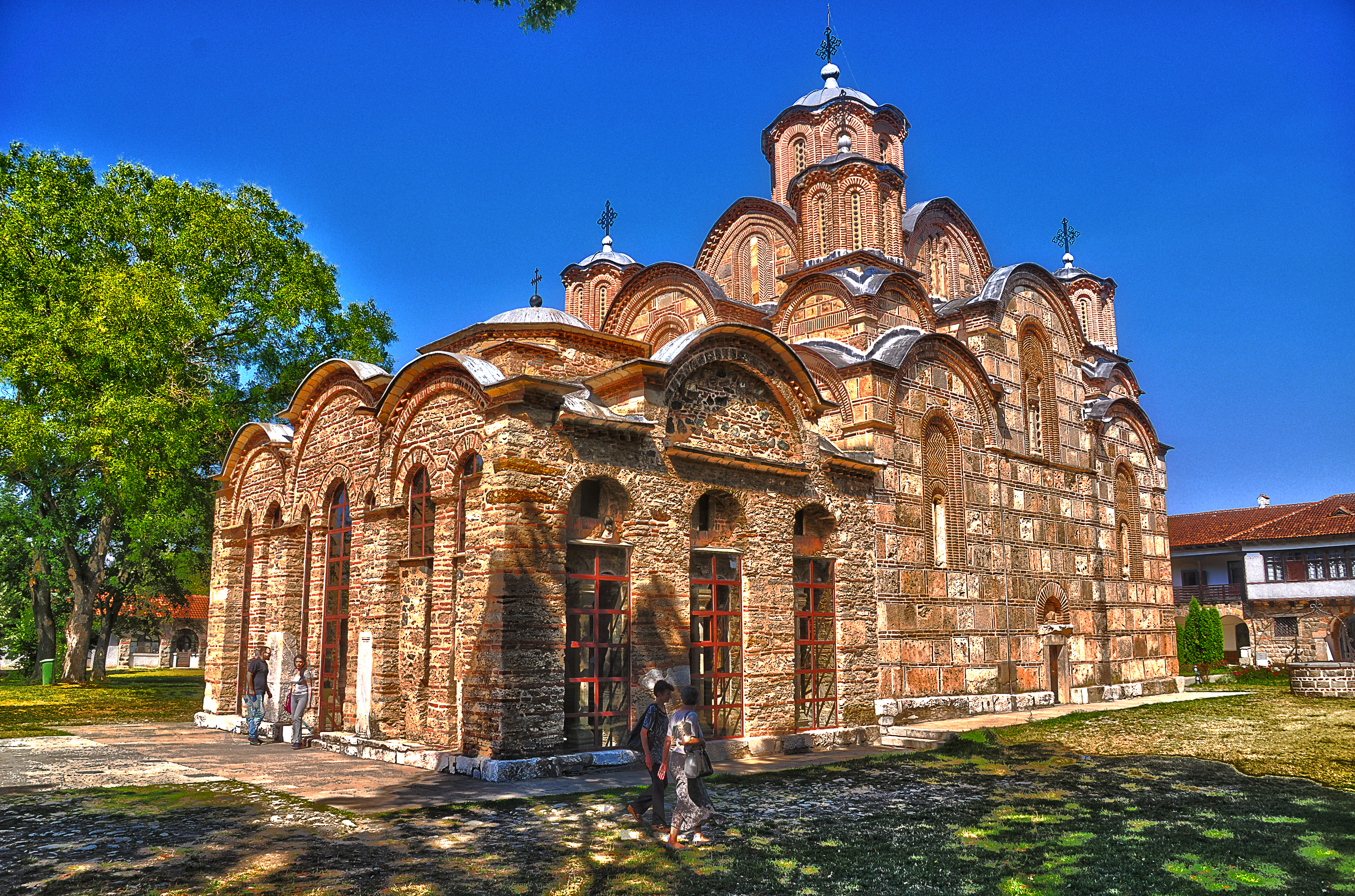
Gračanica monastery by King Stefan Uroš II Milutin Nemanjić in Gračanica, UNESCO World Heritage Site, 1321

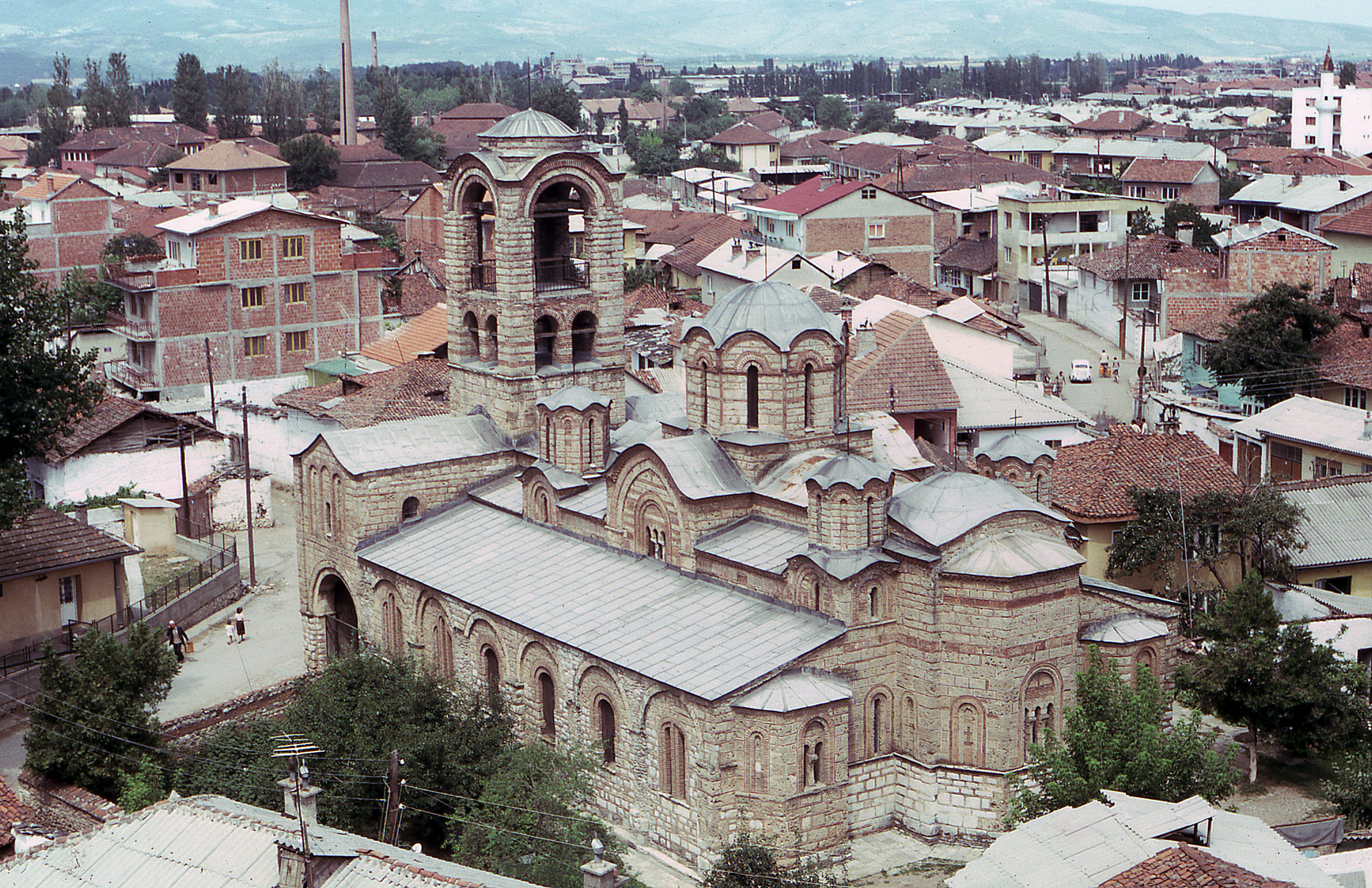
Our Lady of Ljeviš church by King Stefan Uroš II Milutin Nemanjić in Prizren, UNESCO World Heritage Site, 1306–1307

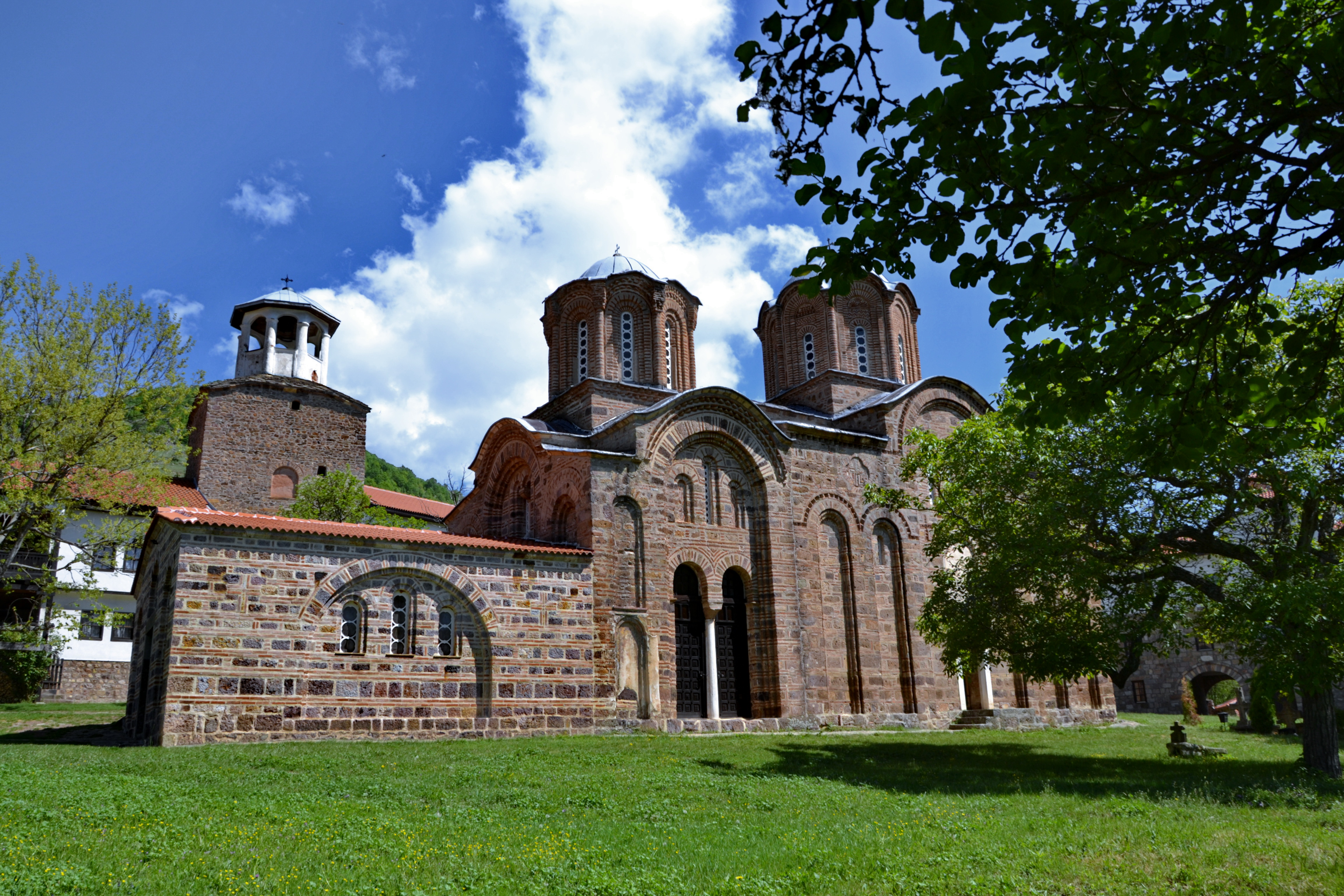
Lesnovo Monastery by Despot Jovan Oliver Grčinić in North Macedonia, 1341

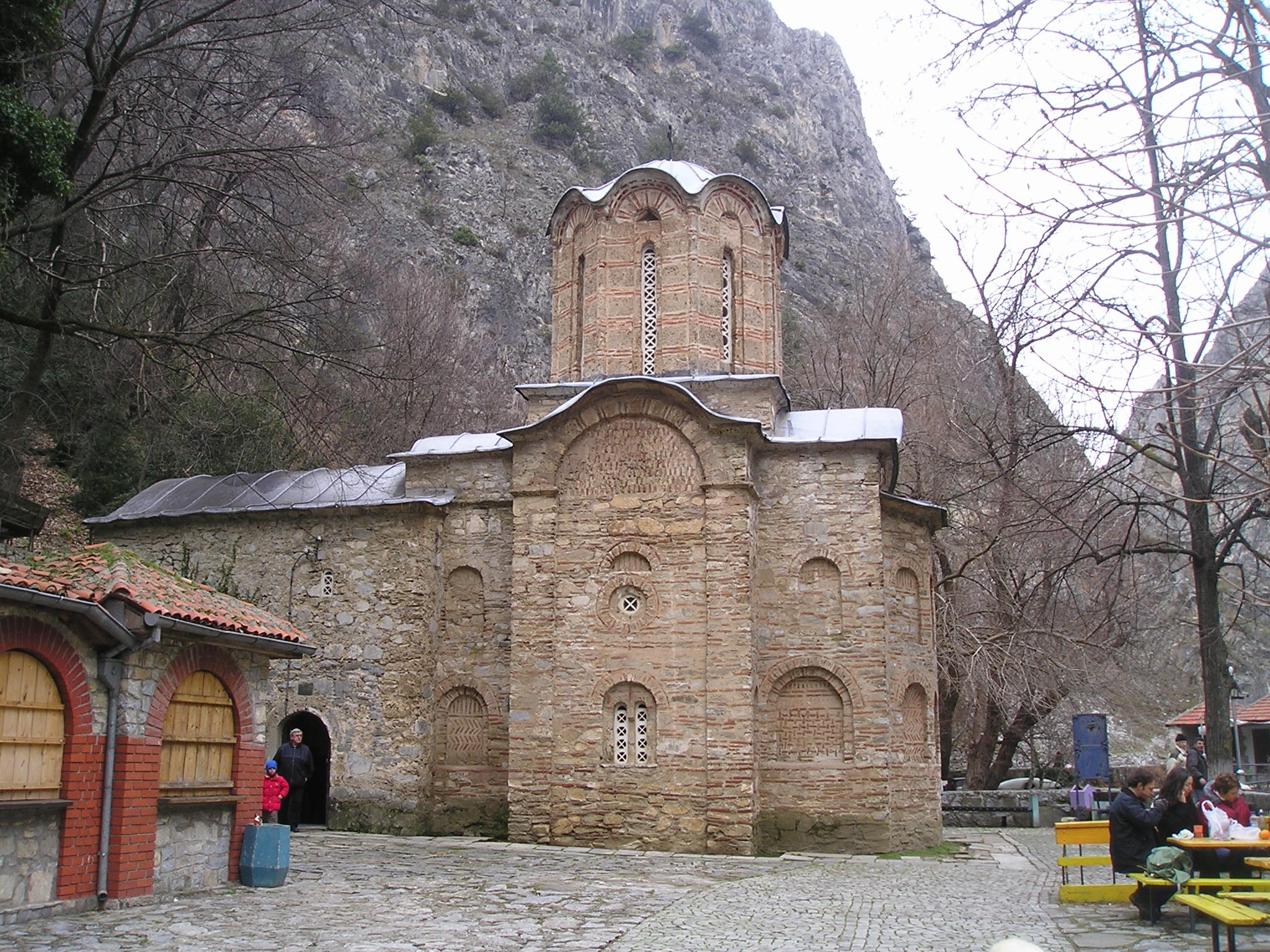
Monastery of St. Andrew by King Vukašin Mrnjavčević in North Macedonia, 1389

==== Morava Style ====
Morava architectural school, is an ecclesiastical architectural style during the Middle Ages covering the period from the seventh decade of the 14th century (Battle of Maritsa in 1371 is often used as the turning point) to 1459, when Serbia fell under Ottoman rule, while the symbolic beginning of the epoch was marked by Lazar's construction of Ravanica (1375–1377) and Lazarica (1375–1378).

The very style is named after the Great Morava river, near to which most of these churches were built. The basic characteristic of this style is the foundation of the church in the form of trolistas and trikonhos, which is in fact a church with a cross-like foundation (normal and concise), like in the Serbo-Byzantine style, to which, in addition to the altar, are added two apse for church singing from the south and north, modeled after the Mount Athos monasteries. With the normal foundation of the church, the interior is the same as with the Serbo-Byzantine style, while with the concise foundation there are some differences. According to their external design, Morava style structures are very similar to those in the Serbo-Byzantine style, because they use grey or yellowish stones and red bricks, although there are also those with mortar façades (Ravanica). However, unlike the Serbo-Byzantine style, in which stones and bricks are not always built to form ornamental patterns, the Moravian style is usually decorated by replacing bricks and sieges, especially the higher areas of the church. In addition, the use of stone rose windows is very common, as is the relief that covers all portals, windows, and arches. Decorative reliefs contain coils, displays of plants, animals and people.

The style, in itself, represents a more authentic Serbian style, as opposed to the Raška and Vardar styles, which originated under the direct influence of romanesque, gothic and Byzantine architecture. The same goes for the frescos, which has developed a new Serbian style which is more intimate, sensitive and effeminate in appearance. During this period, the fortifications architecture developed as part of the two largest fortresses on Serbian soil, including extensive fortified churches. During the first quarter of the 15th century, Prince Stefan Lazarević built the Belgrade Fortress, and in the second quarter Prince Đurađ Branković built Smederevo Fortress.

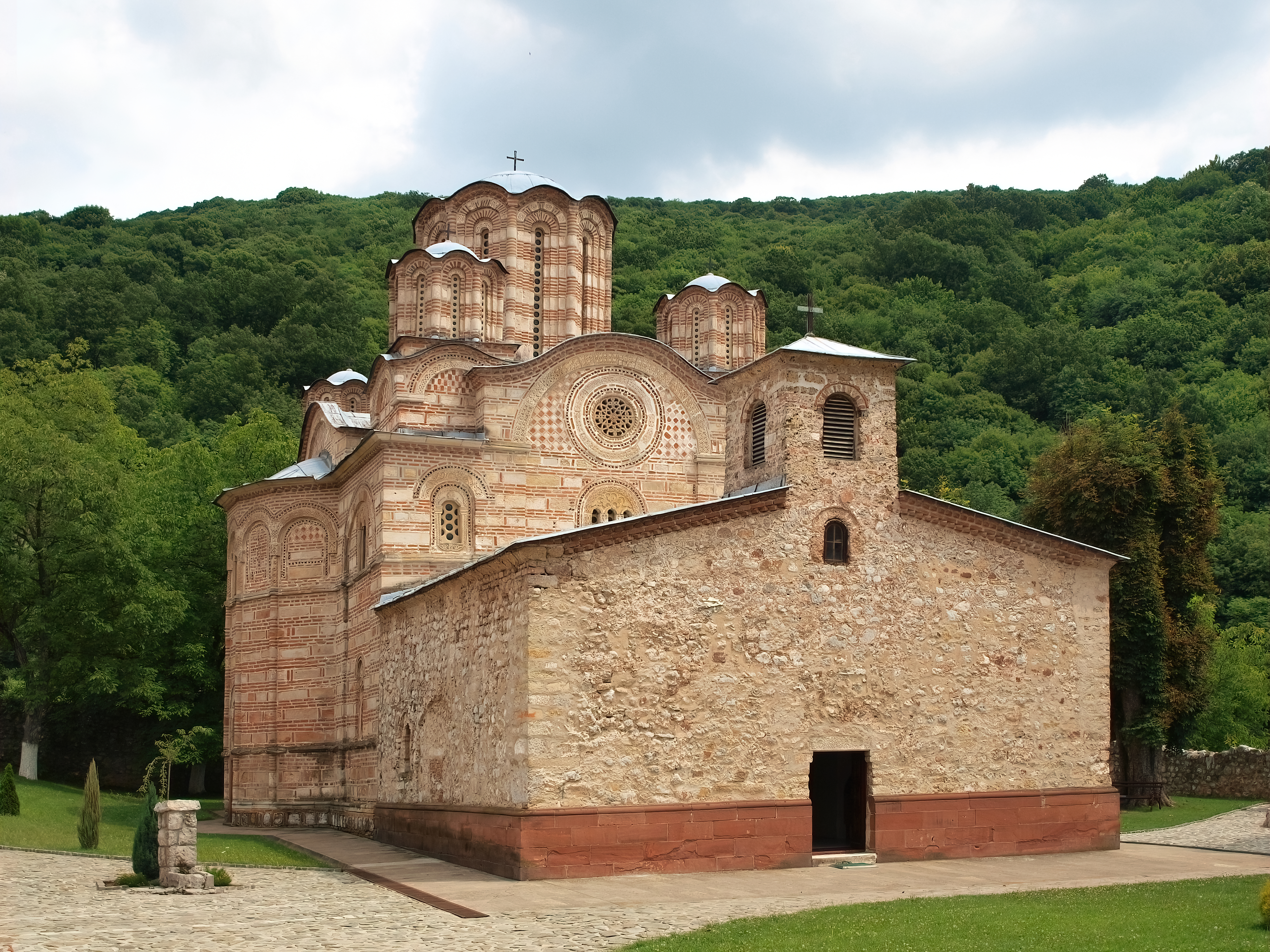
Ravanica Monastery by Prince Lazar Hrebeljanović at Kučaj, 1375–1377

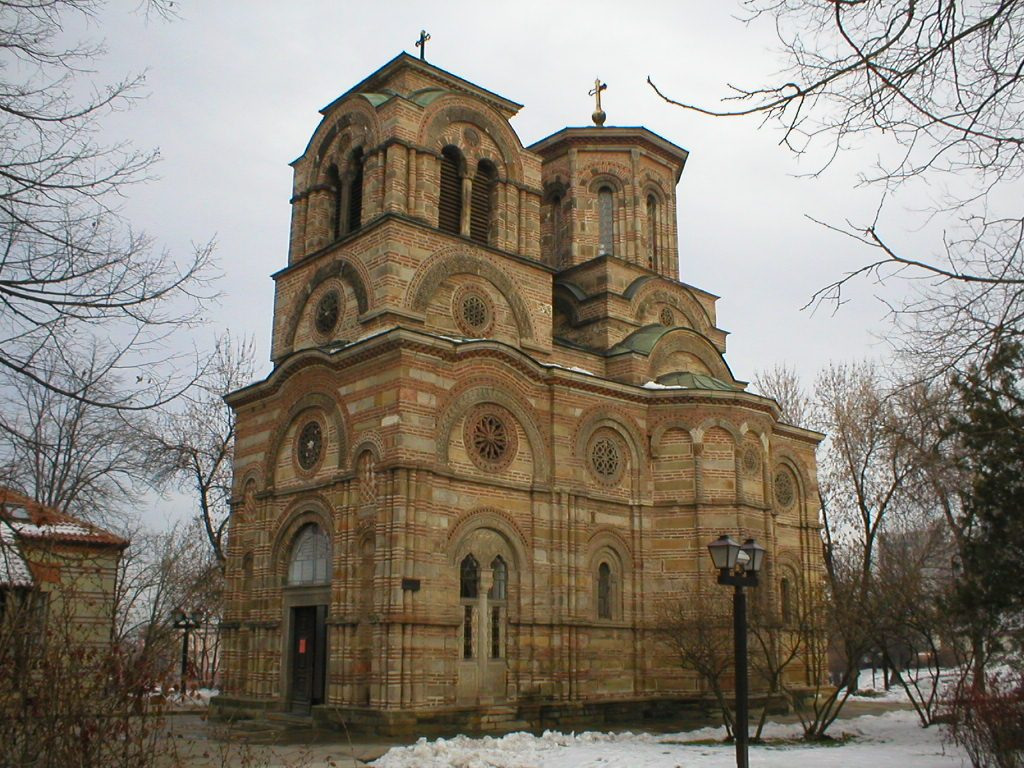
Royal Lazarica Church by Prince Lazar Hrebeljanović in Kruševac, 1375–1378

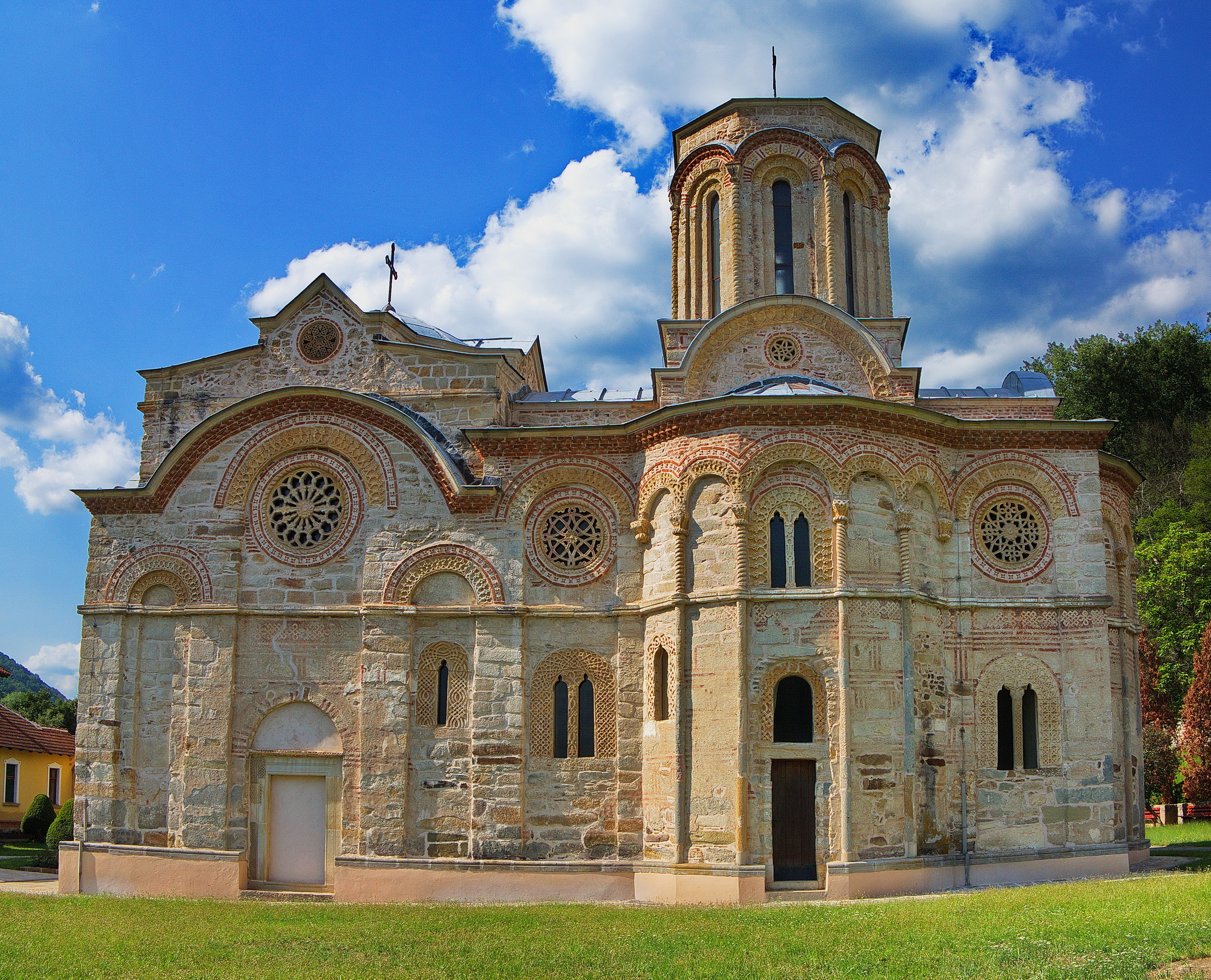
Ljubostinja Monastery by Princess Milica Nemanjić Hrebeljanović near Trstenik, 1388

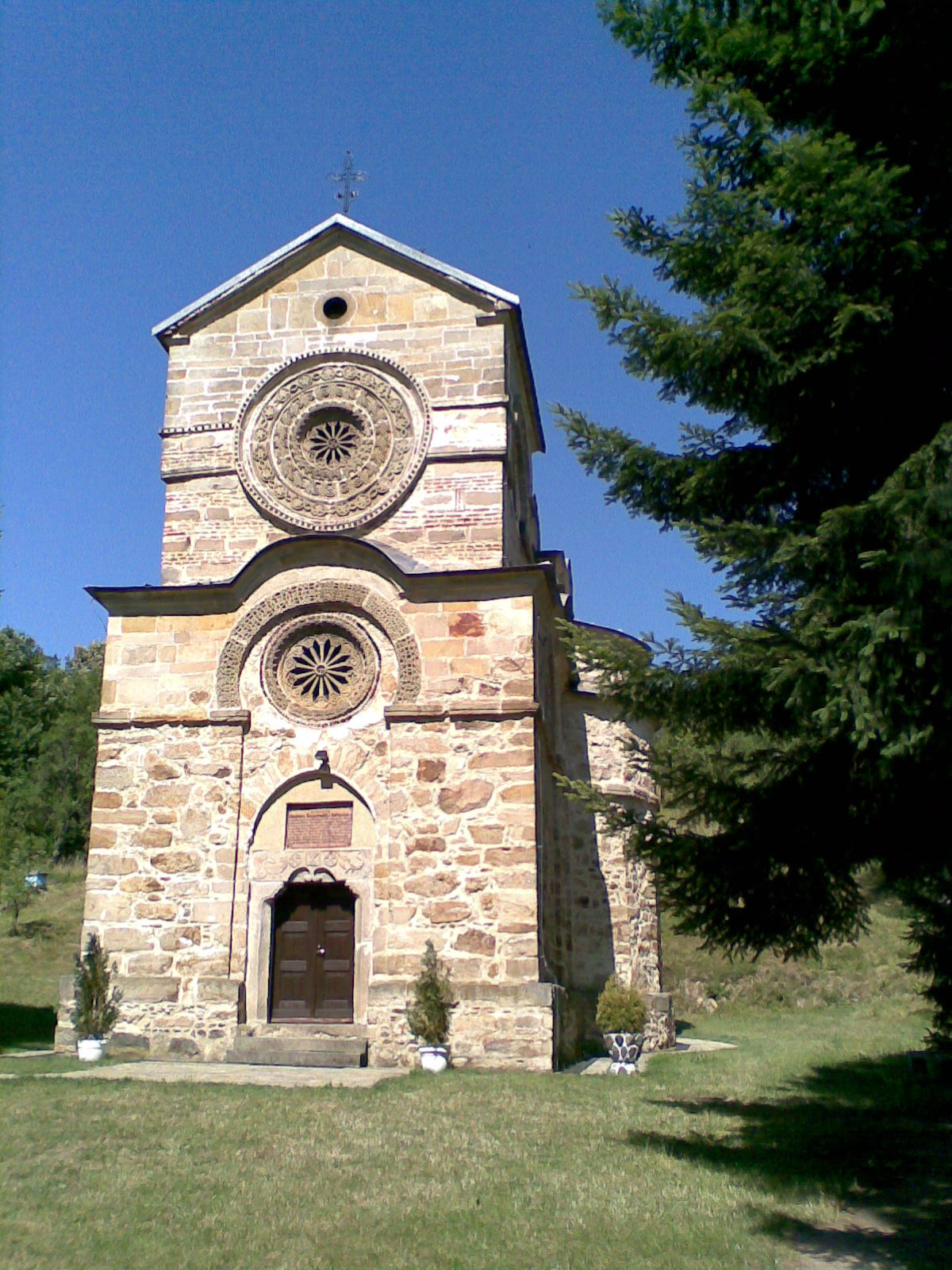
Naupara Monastery near Kruševac, 1391

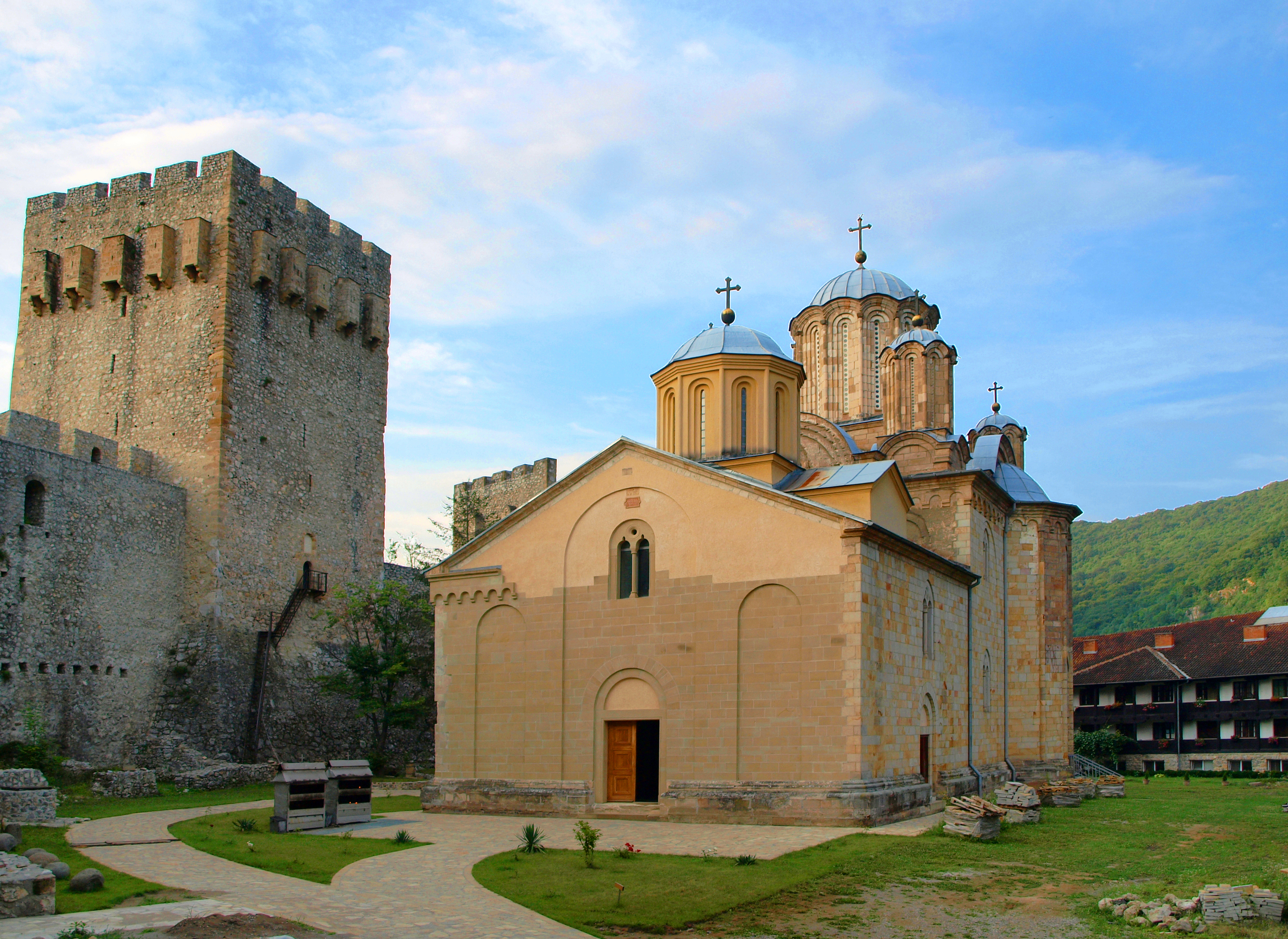
Manasija Monastery by Despot Stefan Lazarević near Despotovac, 1406–1418

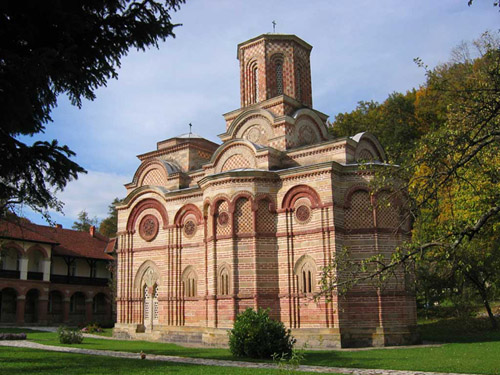
Kalenić Monastery by Despot Stefan Lazarević near Rekovac, 1407–1413

==== Romanesque and Gothic ====
Besides the three common ecclesiastical schools, in the northern part of what is today Vojvodina province, there are examples of Hungarian romanesque and early gothic architecture as seen at Arača and Bač Fortress. Most of this type of architecture was ether demolished during the many wars between Hungary and the Ottomans, or torn down to make way for structures with more period appropriate styles. Because of these historic outcomes, there are very few preserved examples of non-fortification western European romanesque and gothic architecture in Serbia. These types of styles would reappear in the form of historic revival styles in the modernity period.

Orthodox romanesque church design that did not follow Raška school style can be seen with Ružica Church in Belgrade and Church of the Holy Mother of God at Donja Kamenica.

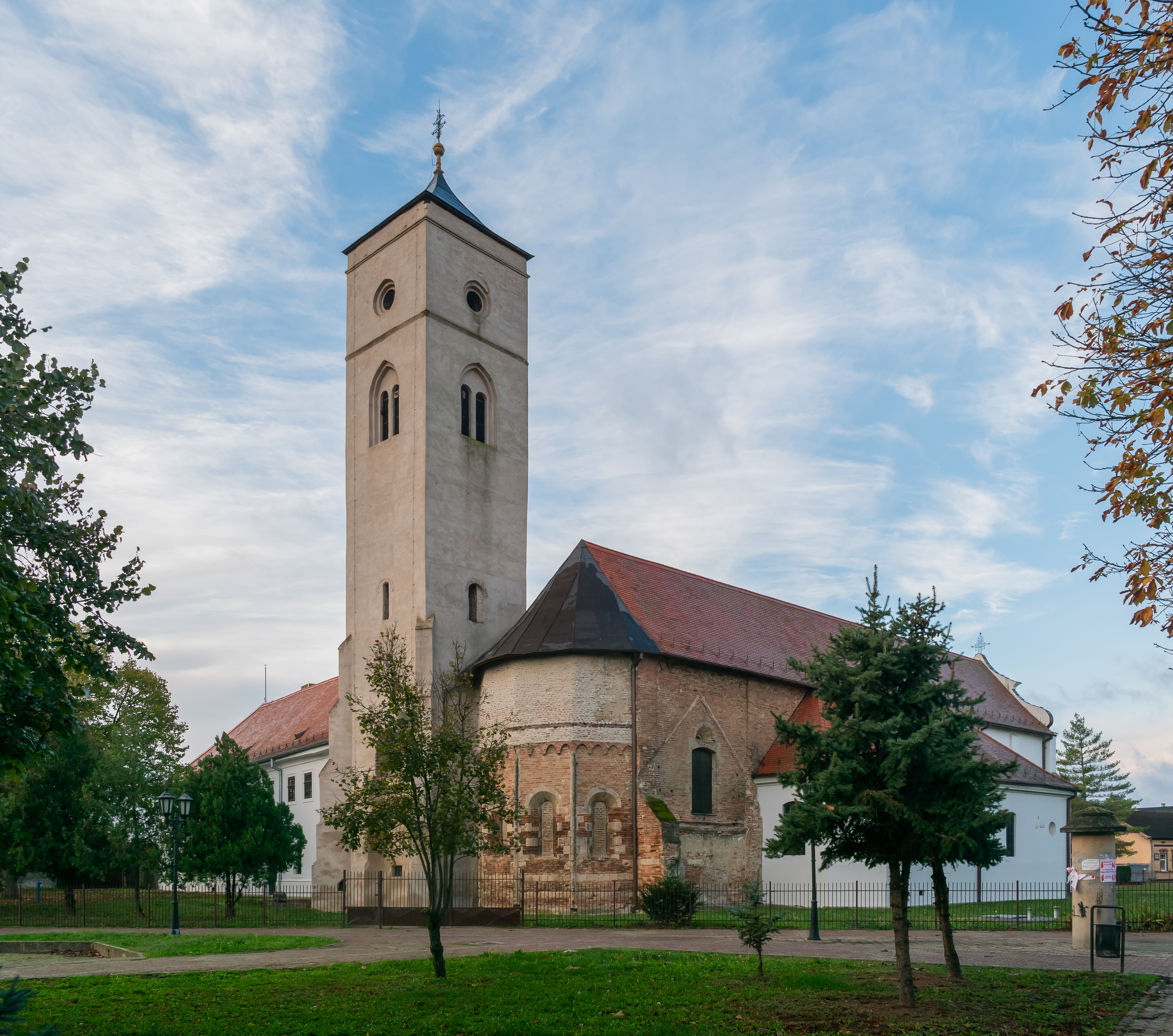
Franciscan Monastery in Bač, 1169

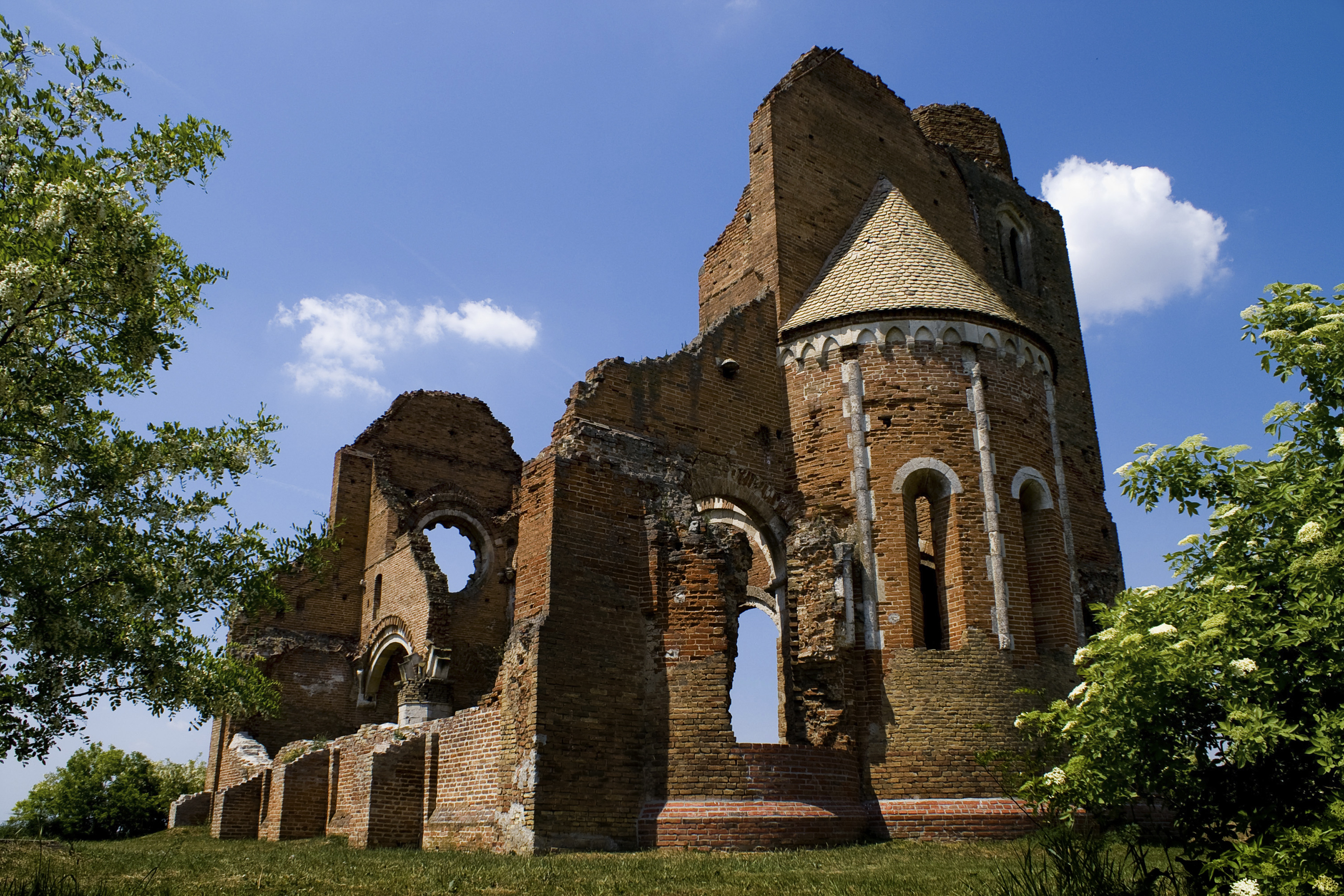
Catholic Arača Church near Novi Bečej, 1230

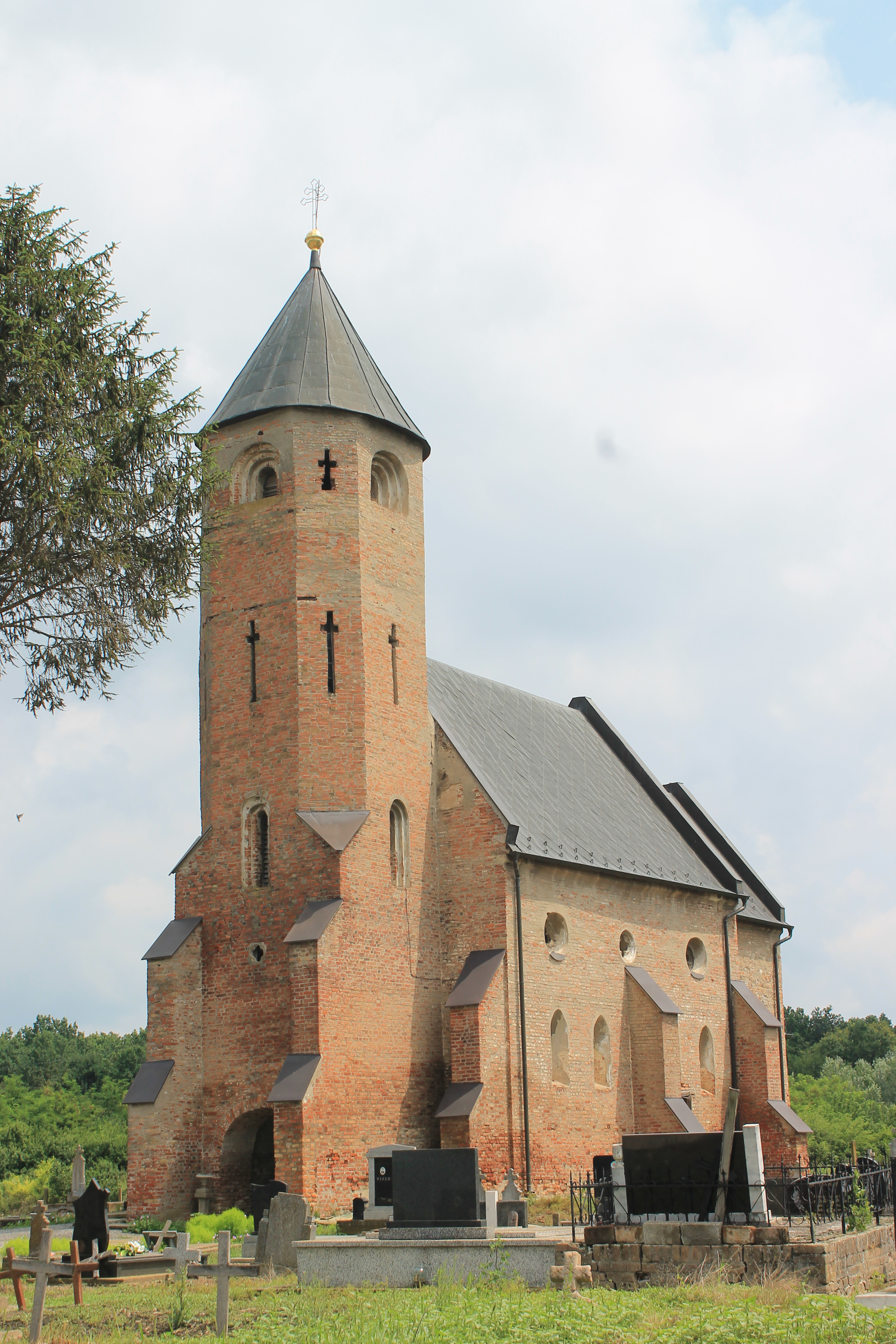
Catholic Church of St. Mary, Morović, 1239

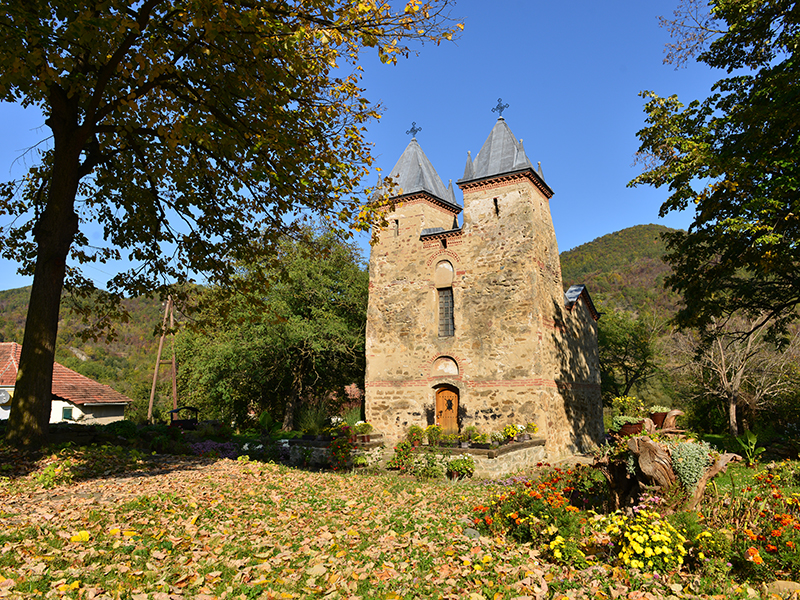
Orthodox Church of the Holy Mother of God at Donja Kamenica, 14th century

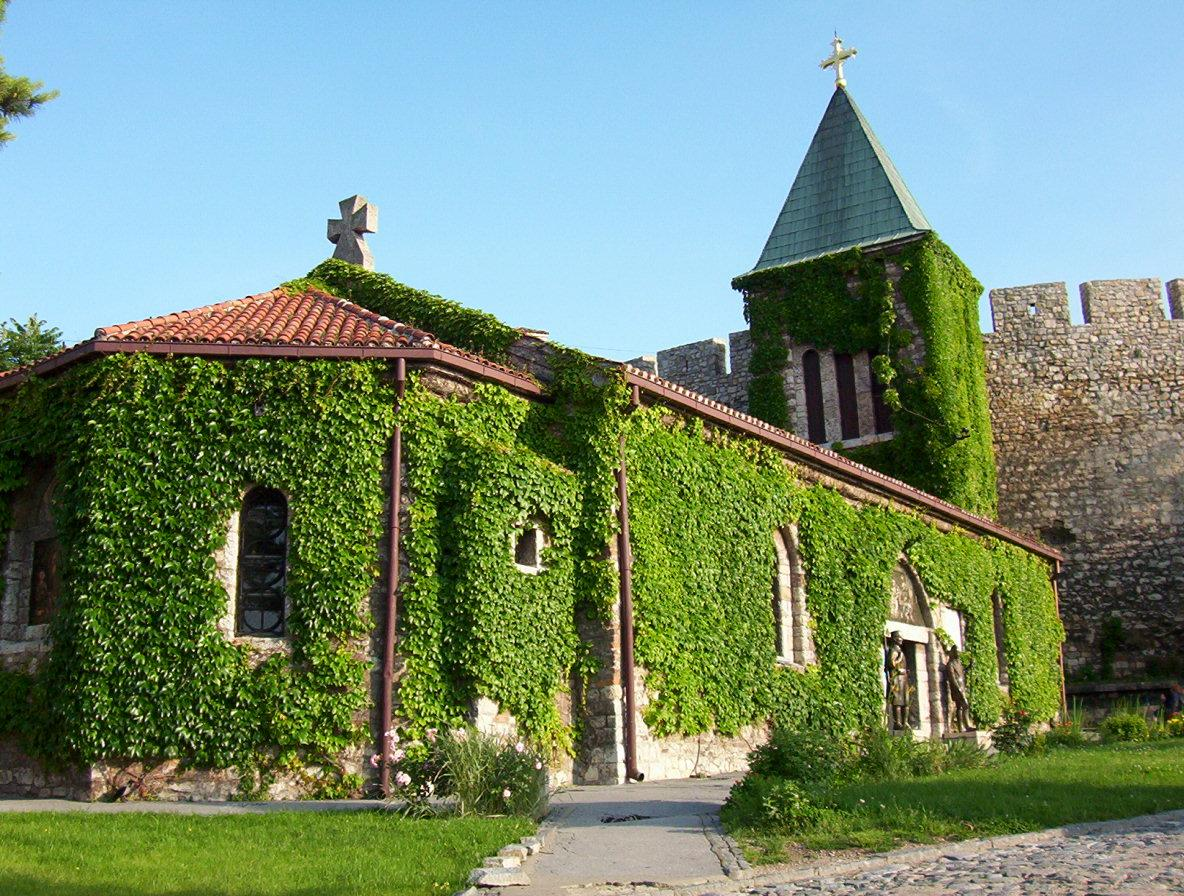
Orthodox Ružica Church by Despot Stefan Lazarević at Belgrade Fortress, Belgrade, 1403

=== Medieval Christian fortifications ===
Most medieval fortification architecture in Serbia followed either Romanesque, Gothic, Byzantine, or Morava style influences. They were either constructed on top of existing Roman or Byzantine fortifications, or on newly planned terrain (either flat or on top of a hill). Surviving examples had all the common castle features depending on the terrain requirements, such as a bailey, keep (including donjon towers), battlements (crenelations, hordings and machicolations), gatehouses, moats, arrowslits, great halls, etc.

Most impressive example of medieval fortifications can be seen with Smederevo Fortress, built by Đurađ Branković between 1428 and 1480. It is considered one of the largest fortifications in Europe in terms of covered terrain. The monumental complex was built in the Byzantine tradition and modeled after Constantinople Fortress.

There are examples of fortified monasteries, such as Manasija (preserved fortified walls) and Ravanica (walls are partially in ruins).

With the introduction of Bastion fort designs in the modernity period, medieval fortresses along the banks of the Danube river would be partially or completely demolished to make way for the geometric star shaped designs. Such fate occurred with Belgrade Fortress, which retained medieval, Ottoman, Habsburg, and bastion fort design elements, contributing towards a more unique eclectic design to the entire complex. Petrovaradin Fortress was built by completely demolishing the fortified monastery of Bélakút, which itself was built around the remains of a Roman fort.

In contemporary Serbia, many of these medieval fortresses and castles are partially or in complete ruins, with efforts made to restore or preserve them through extensive conservation and restoration efforts. There are scant remains of surviving fortress and castle interiors and how they were decorated, with only medieval monasteries (particularly Hilandar at Mount Athos) preserving some interior designs from that period.

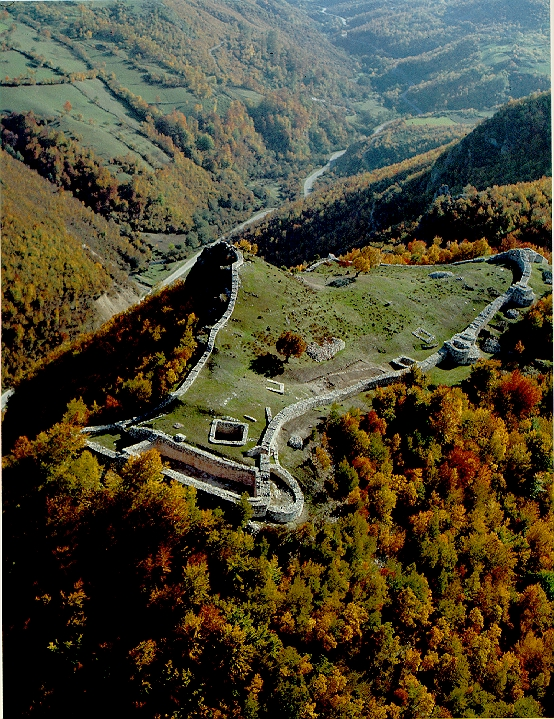
Stari Ras, UNESCO World Heritage Site, 8th century

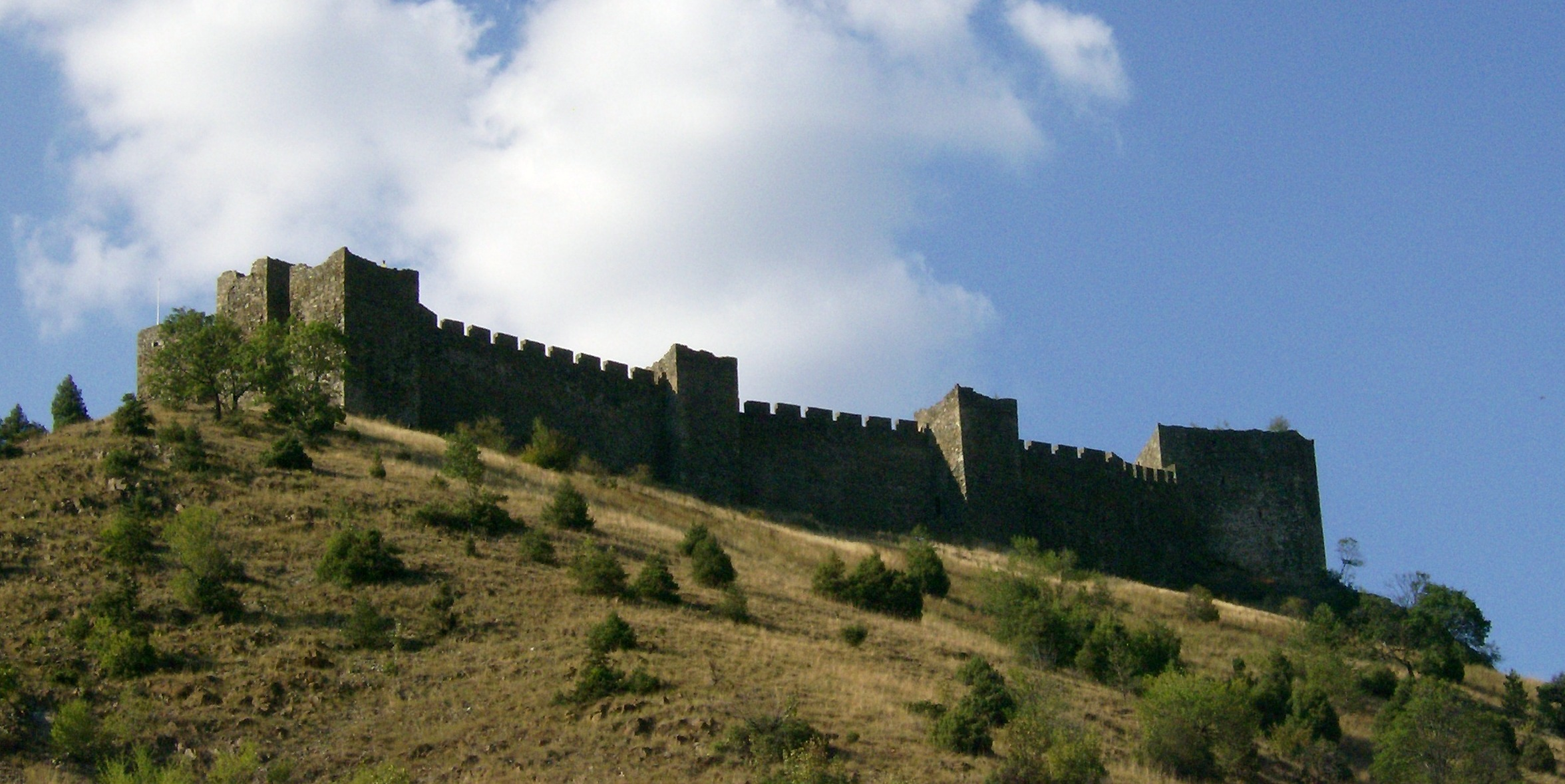
Maglič by King Stefan Nemanjić and King Stefan Uroš I Nemanjić near Kraljevo, 13th century

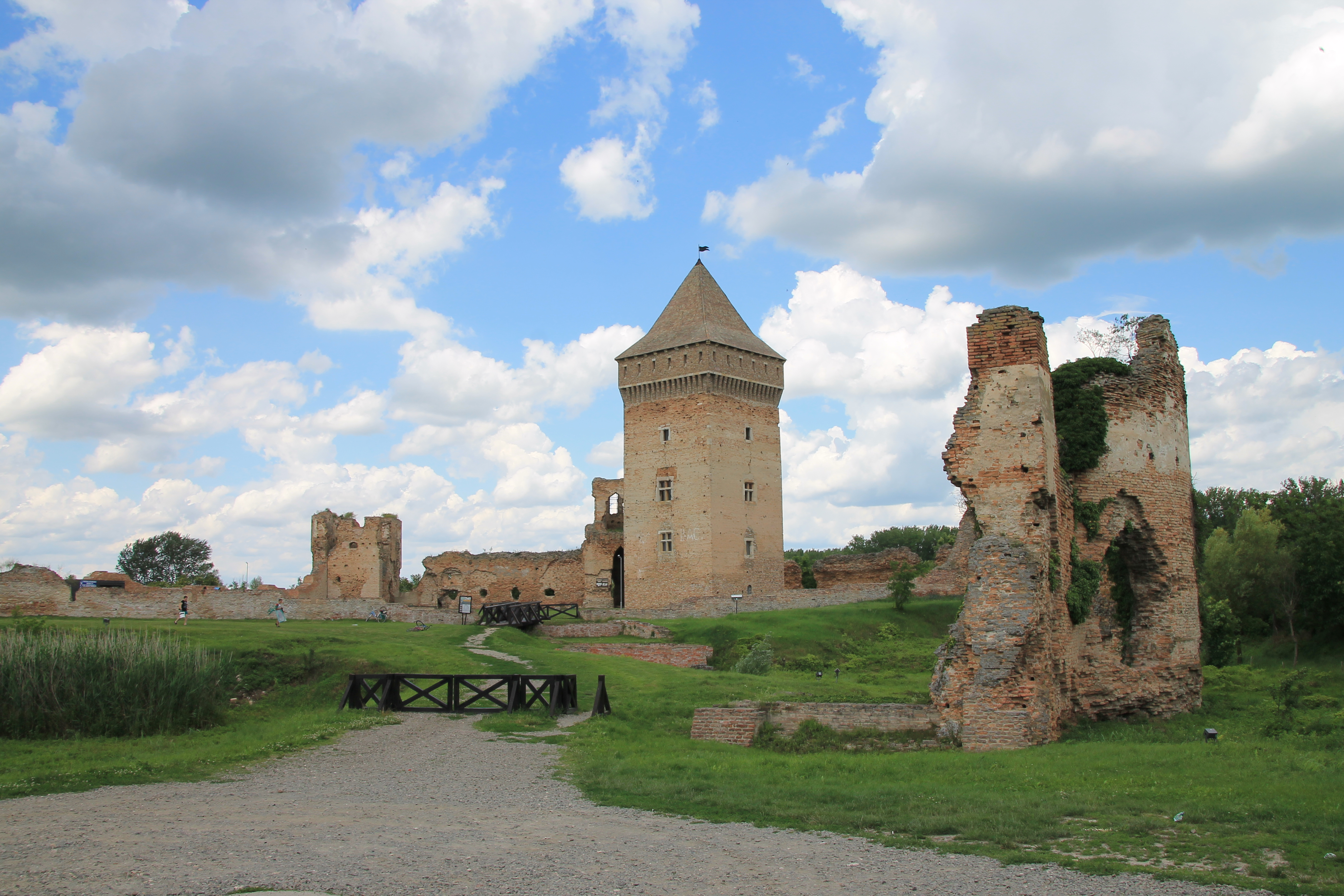
Bač Fortress by King Charles Robert I Anjou, 1342

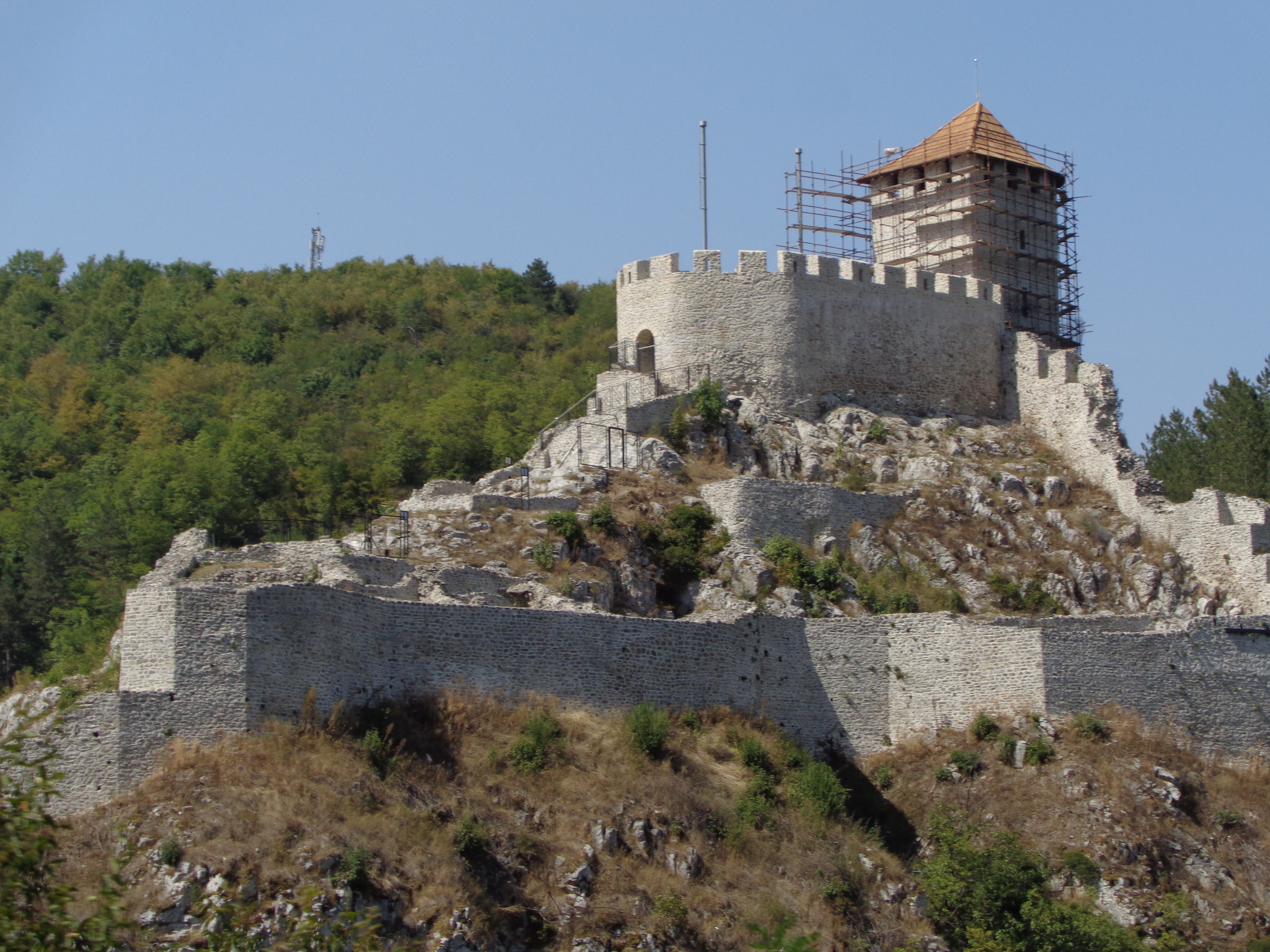
Stari Grad by Prince Nikola Altomanović in Užice, 14th century

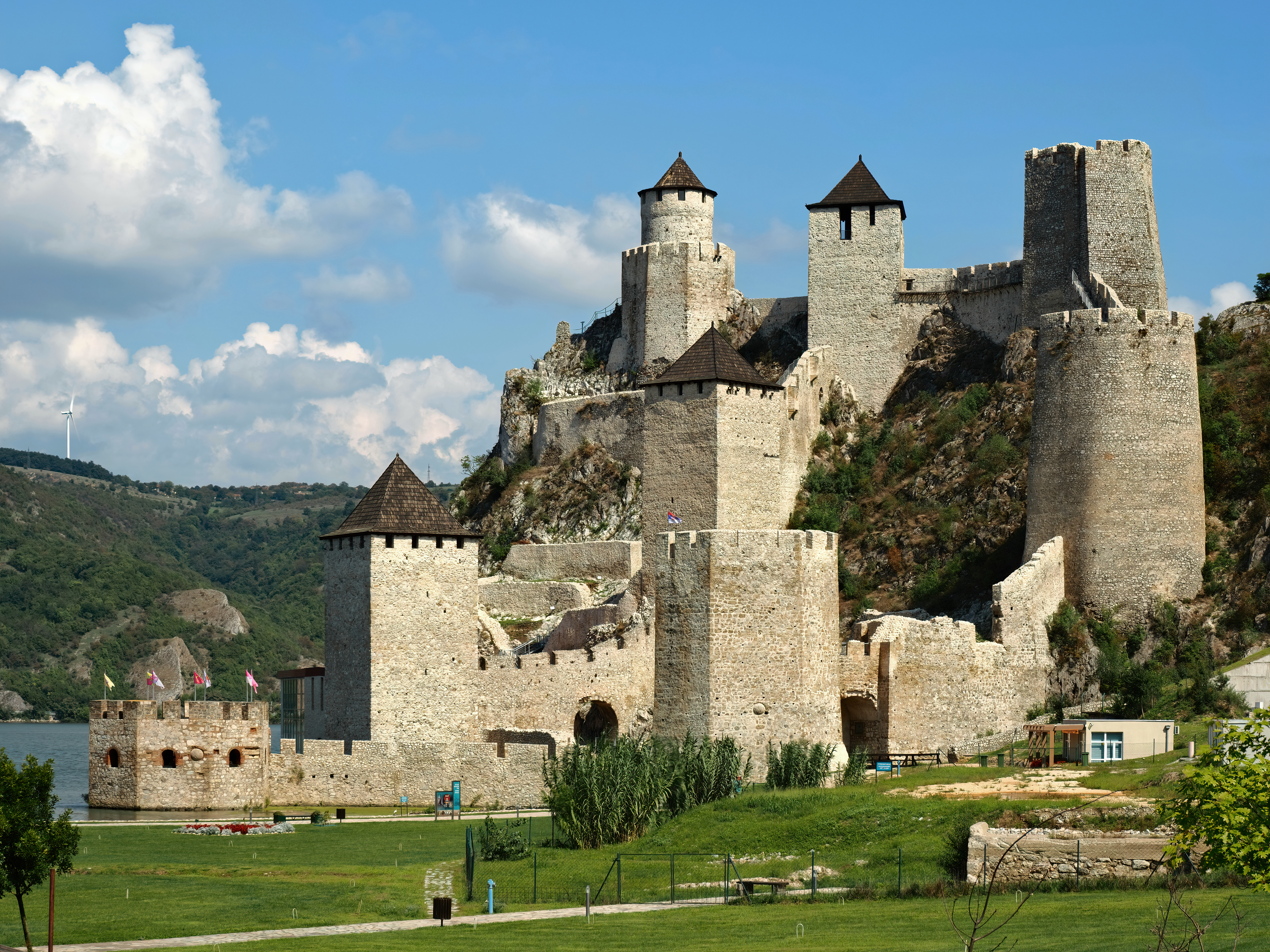
Golubac Fortress, 14th century

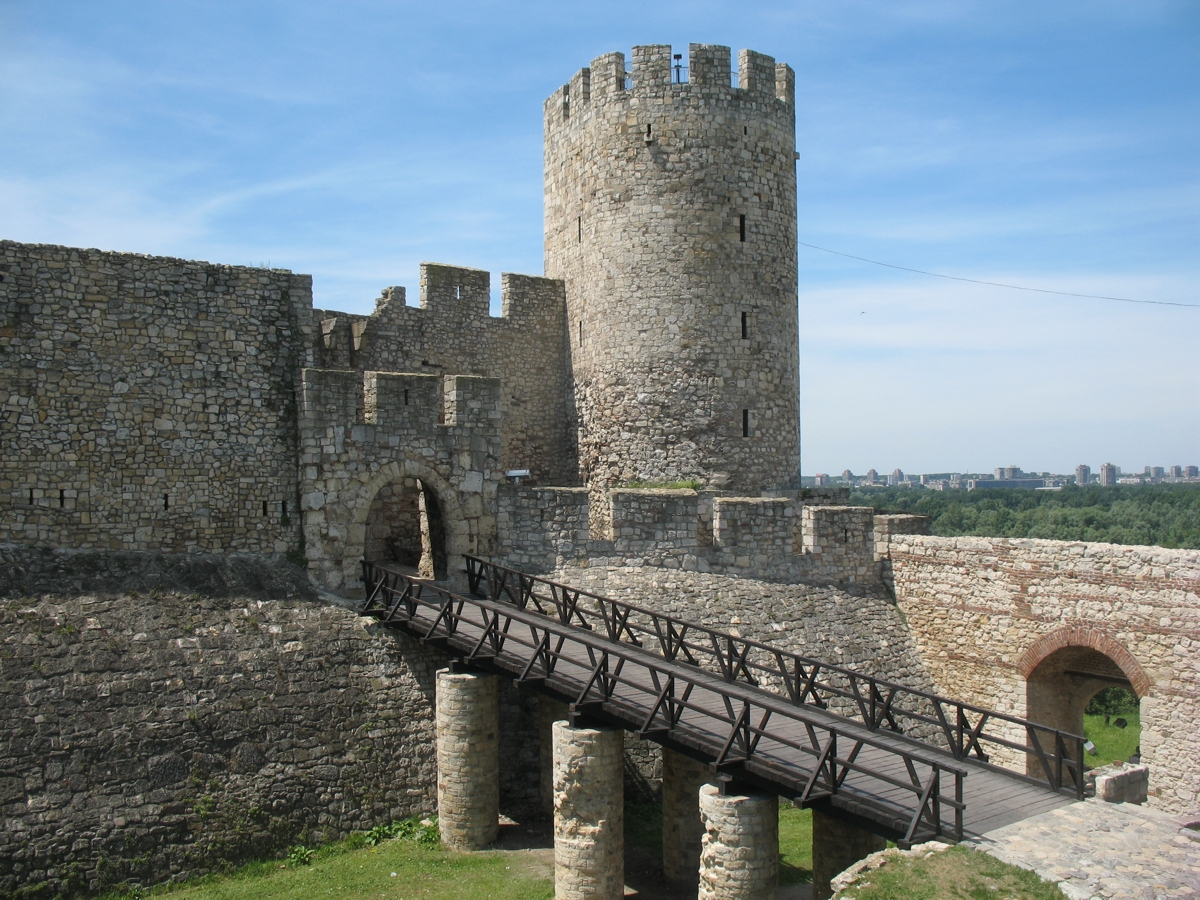
Despot Stefan Tower by Despot Stefan Lazarević at Belgrade Fortress, 1405

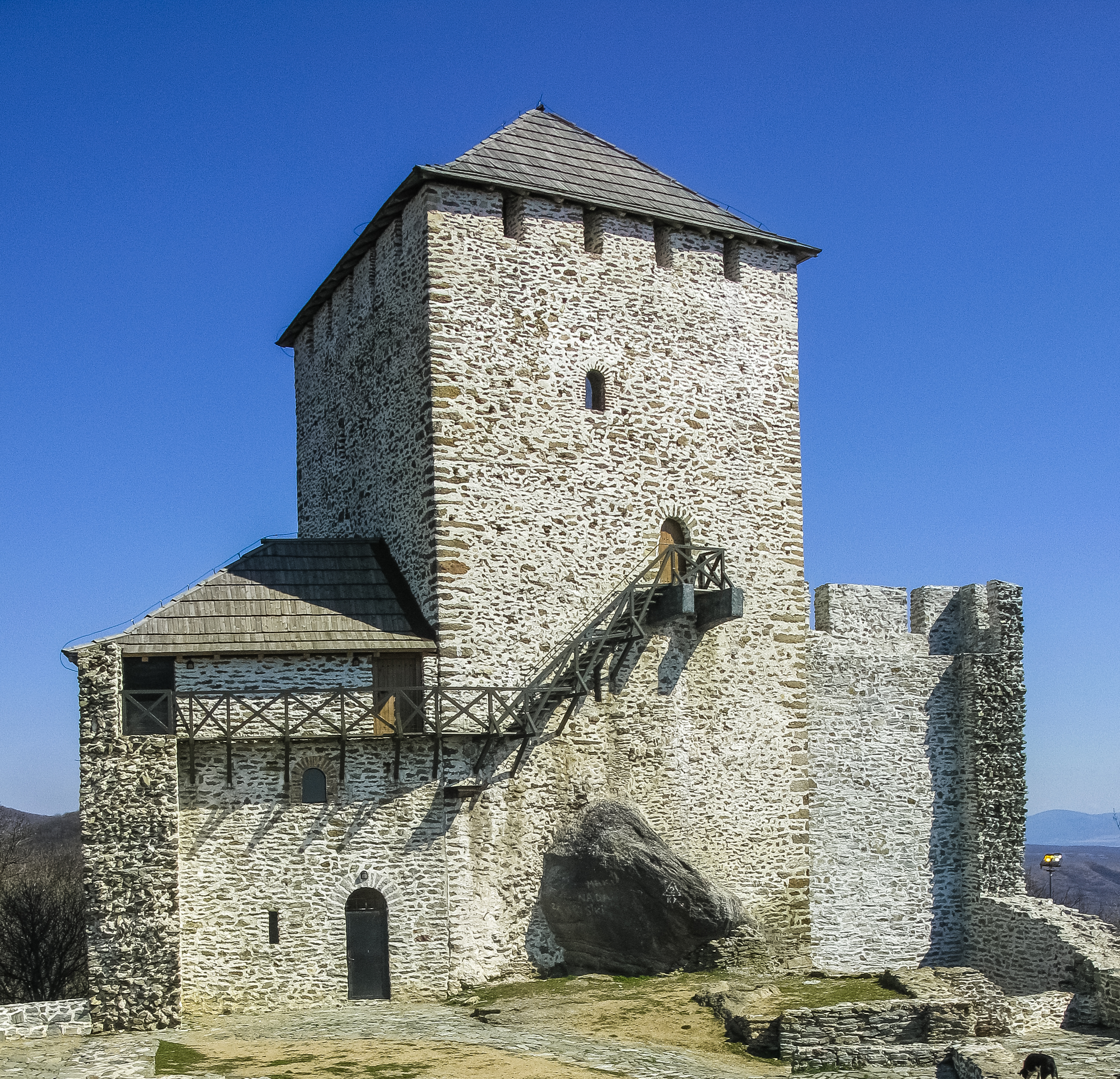
Vršac Castle by Despot Đurađ Branković, 1439

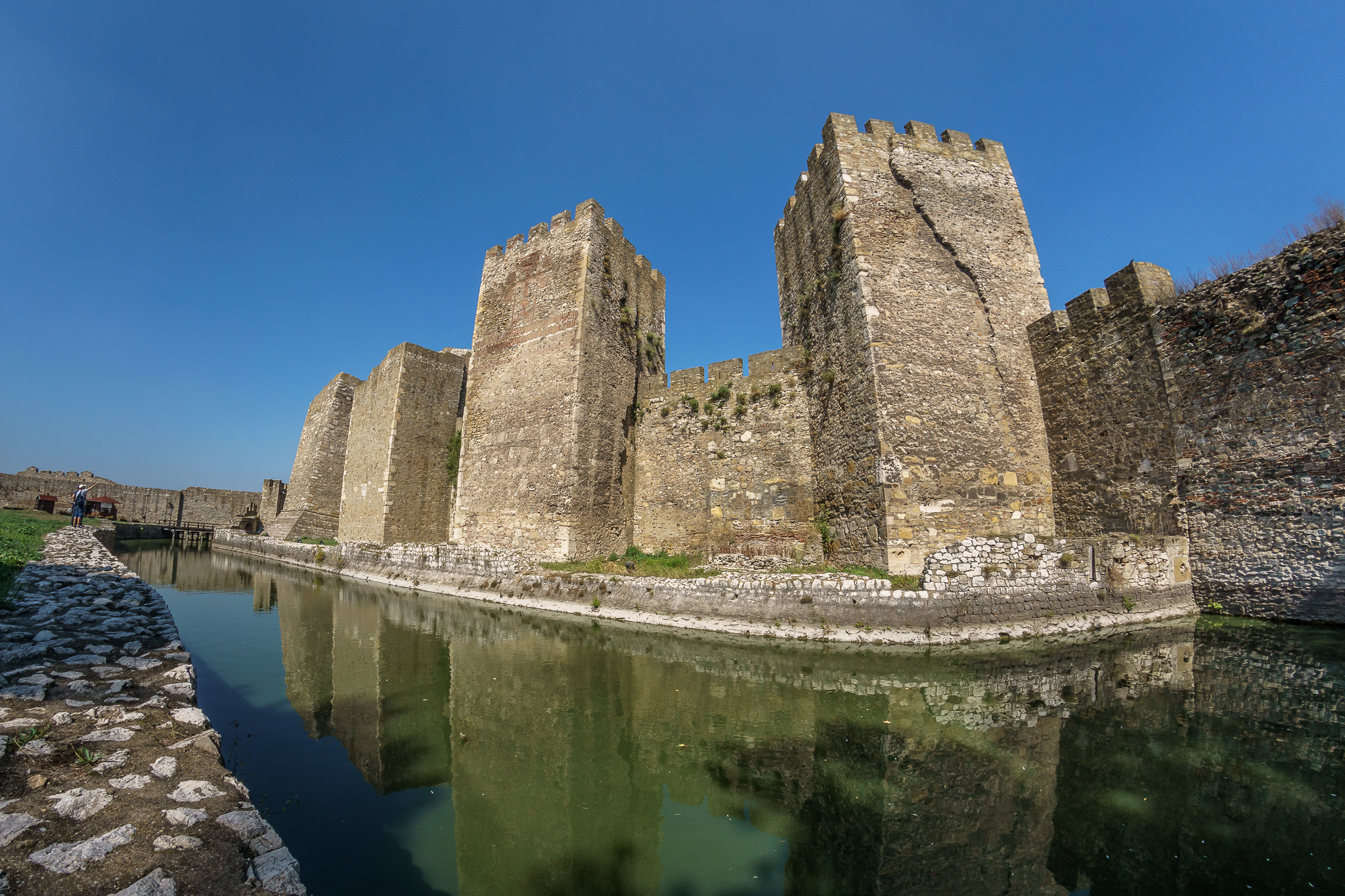
Smederevo Fortress by Despot Đurađ Branković, 1480

== Modernity period ==
Modernity period between the 15th to early 18th century is characterized by vernacular local styles, as well as Ottoman and Islamic architecture. The late 18th and the early 20th century showcased the most rapid shift in architectural styles in Revolutionary Serbia, as well as areas controlled by the Habsburg Empire. Trying to cut ties from Ottoman influence, both politically, culturally and architectural, Serbia would shift towards more western European styled architecture and city planning that were common in Serb populated areas of the Habsburg Empire. Skilled architects from what would later be known as Vojvodina province, as well as educated architects from the Principality and later Kingdom of Serbia, would contribute in reshaping the visual appearances of most liberated Serbian cities south of the Danube. Ottoman inspired architectural styles persisted in the southern most areas, particularly in Sandžak and Kosovo and Metohija, mostly areas with larger muslim populations.

=== Ottoman and Islamic architecture ===
The territory of what is now the Republic of Serbia was part of the Ottoman Empire throughout the Early Modern period, especially Central Serbia, unlike Vojvodina which has passed to Habsburg rule starting from the end of the 17th century (with several takeovers of Central Serbia as well). Ottoman culture significantly influenced the region, in architecture, cuisine, language, and dress, especially in arts, and Islam.

Most Ottoman period mosques in Serbia are not as elaborate as in neighboring Albania, Bosnia and Herzegovina and North Macedonia, with shorter minarets and mosque sizes. However, contemporary mosques such as the one in Delimeđe has one of the tallest minarets in Europe outside of Turkey.

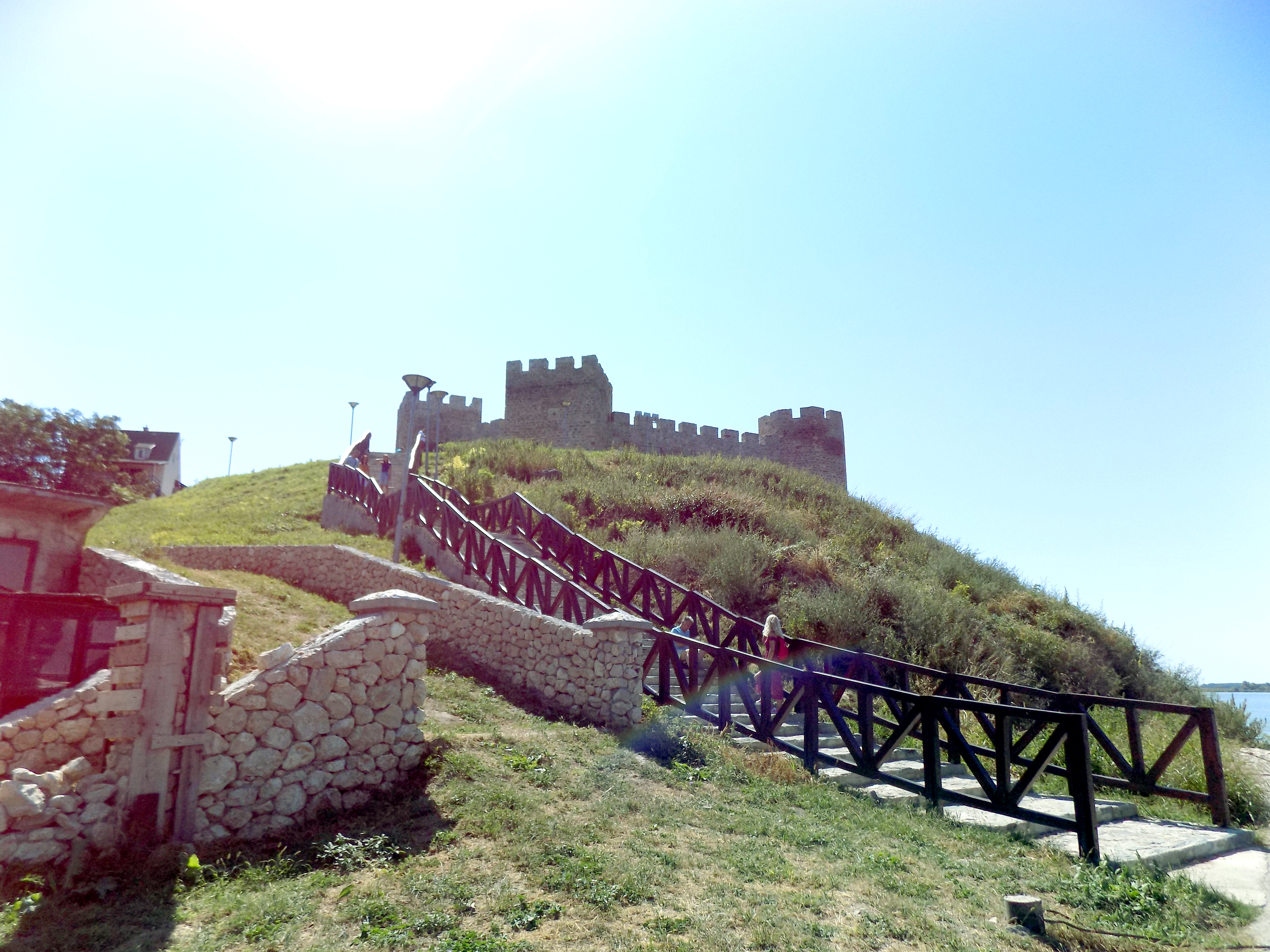
Ram Fortress by Sultan Bayezid bin Mehmed Ottoman, 1483

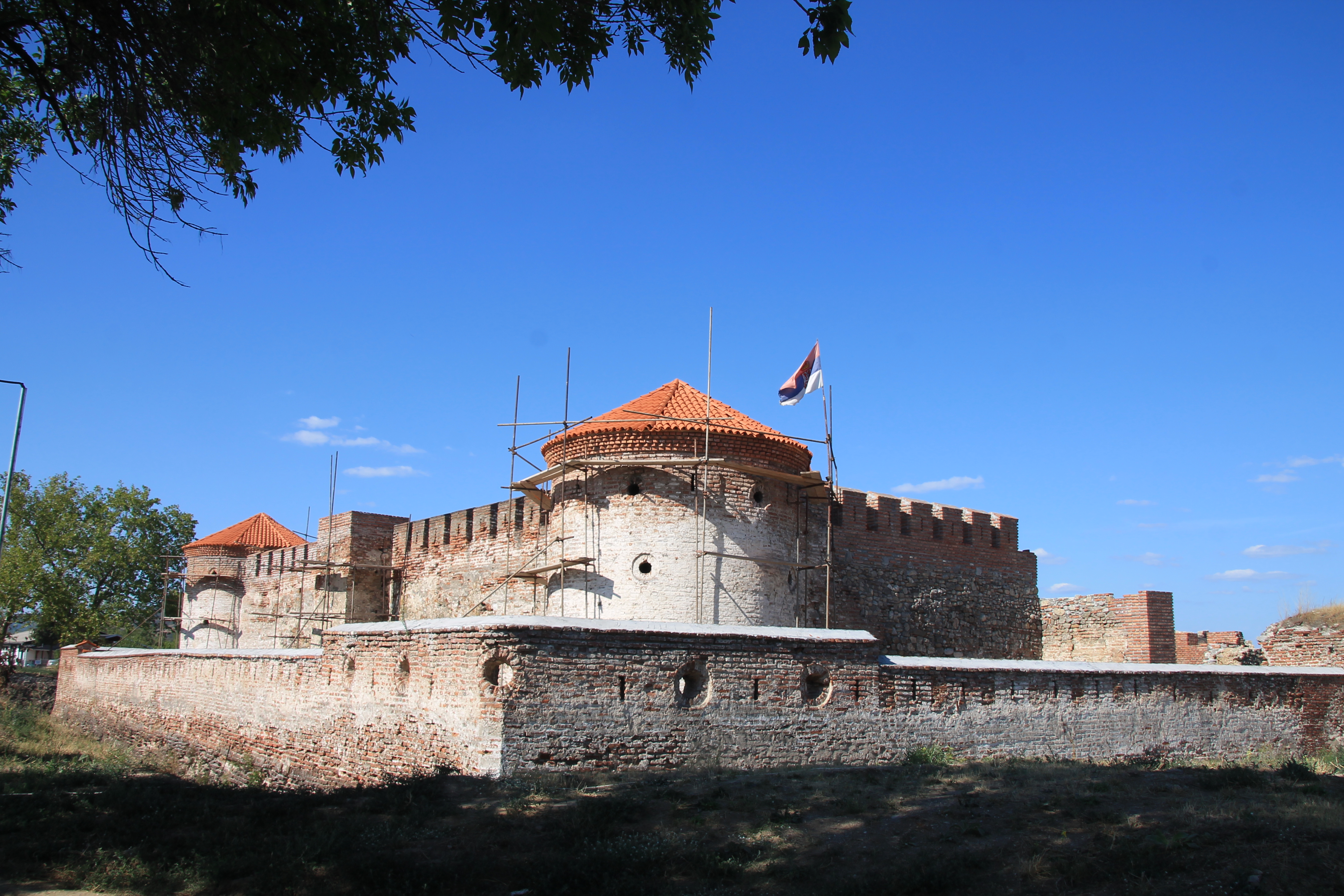
Fetislam Fortress near Kladovo, 1524

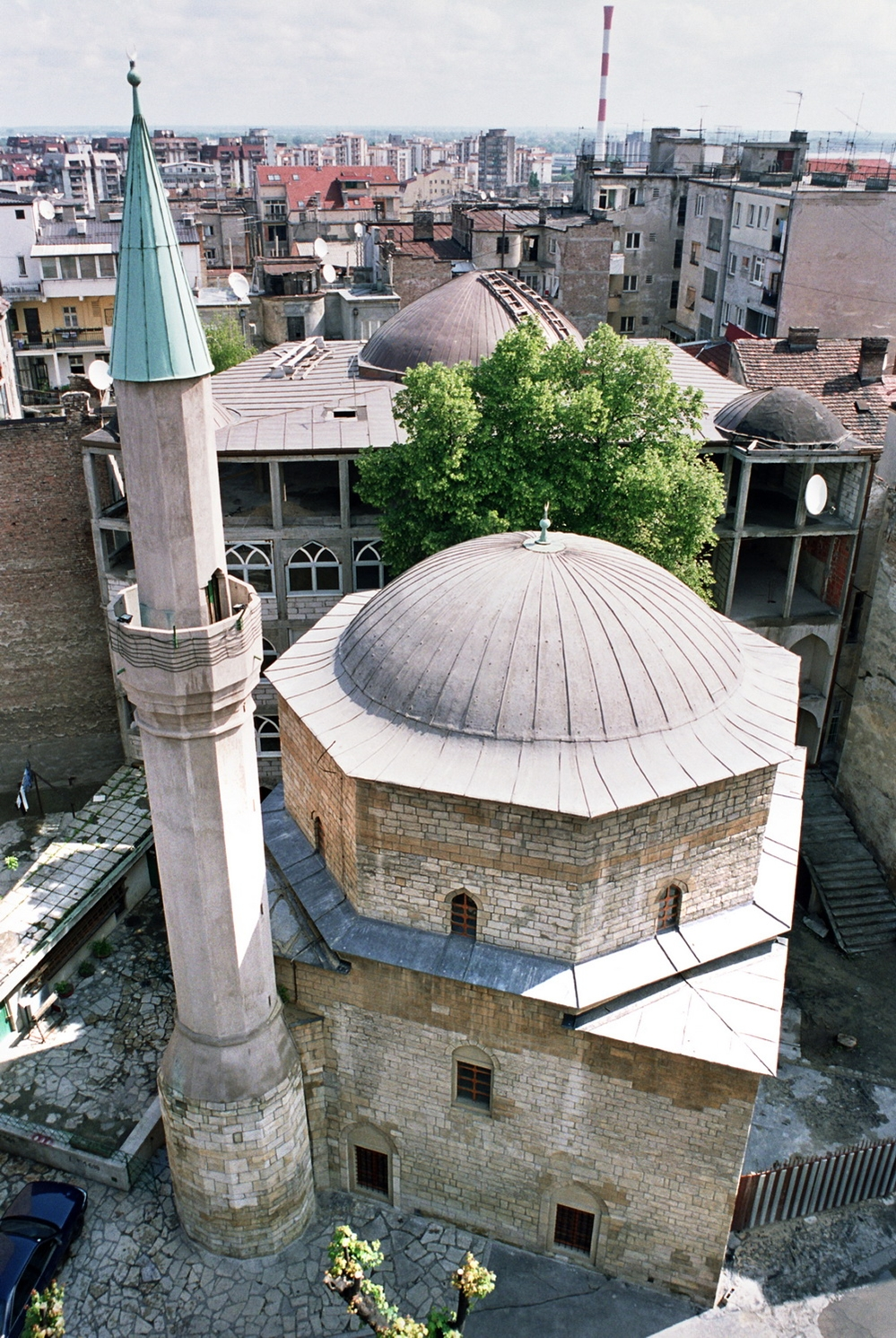
Bajrakli Mosque in Belgrade, 1575

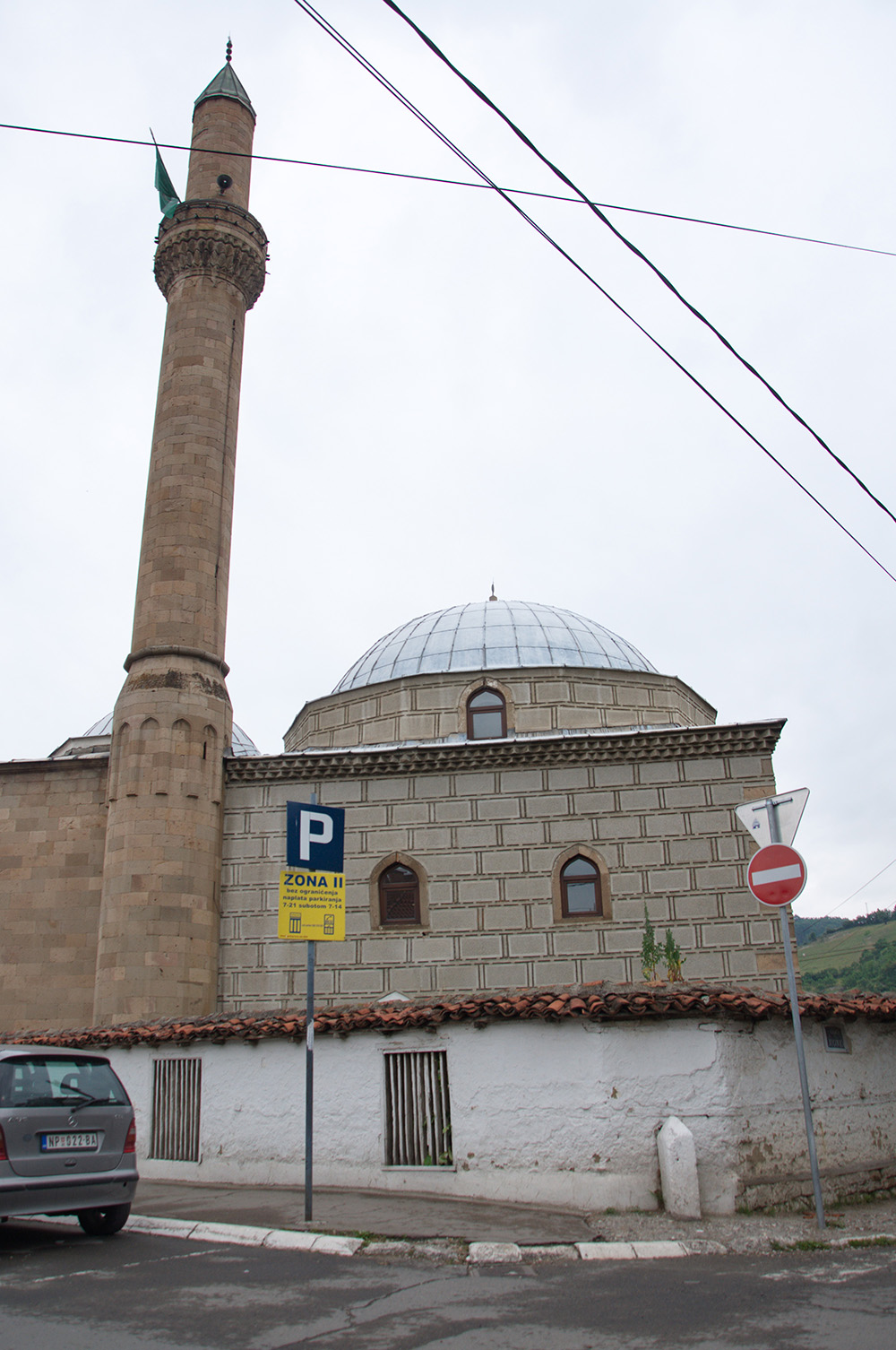
Altun-Alem Mosque in Novi Pazar, 1516/28

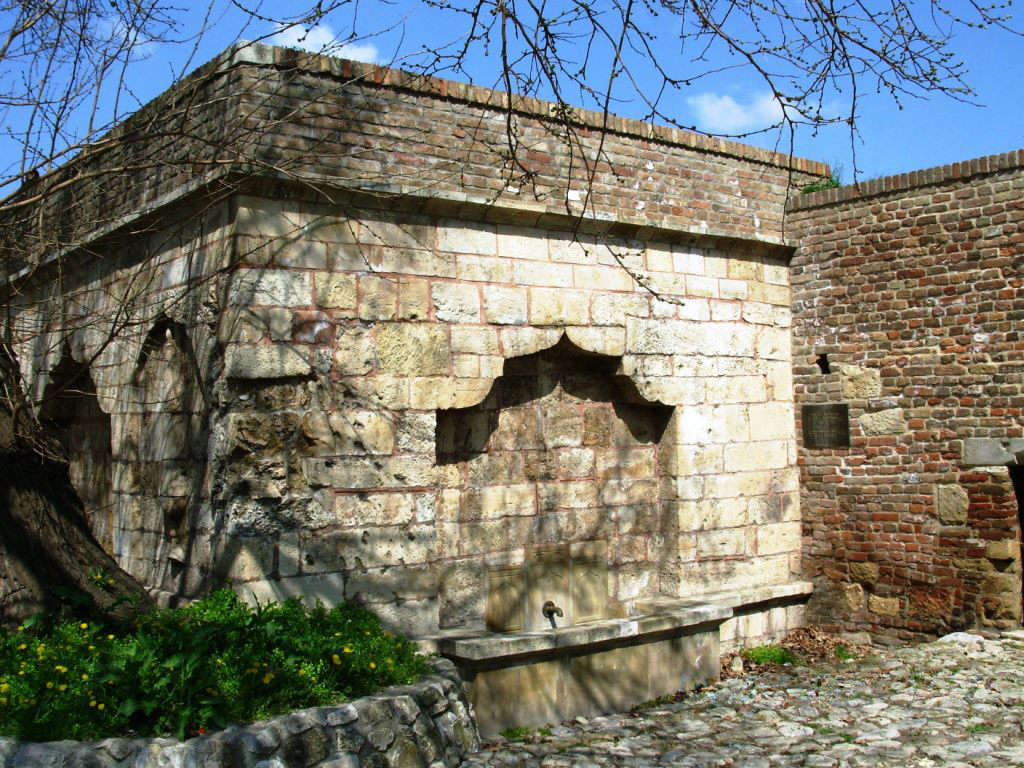
Mehmed Paša Sokolović's Fountain in Belgrade, 1576/77

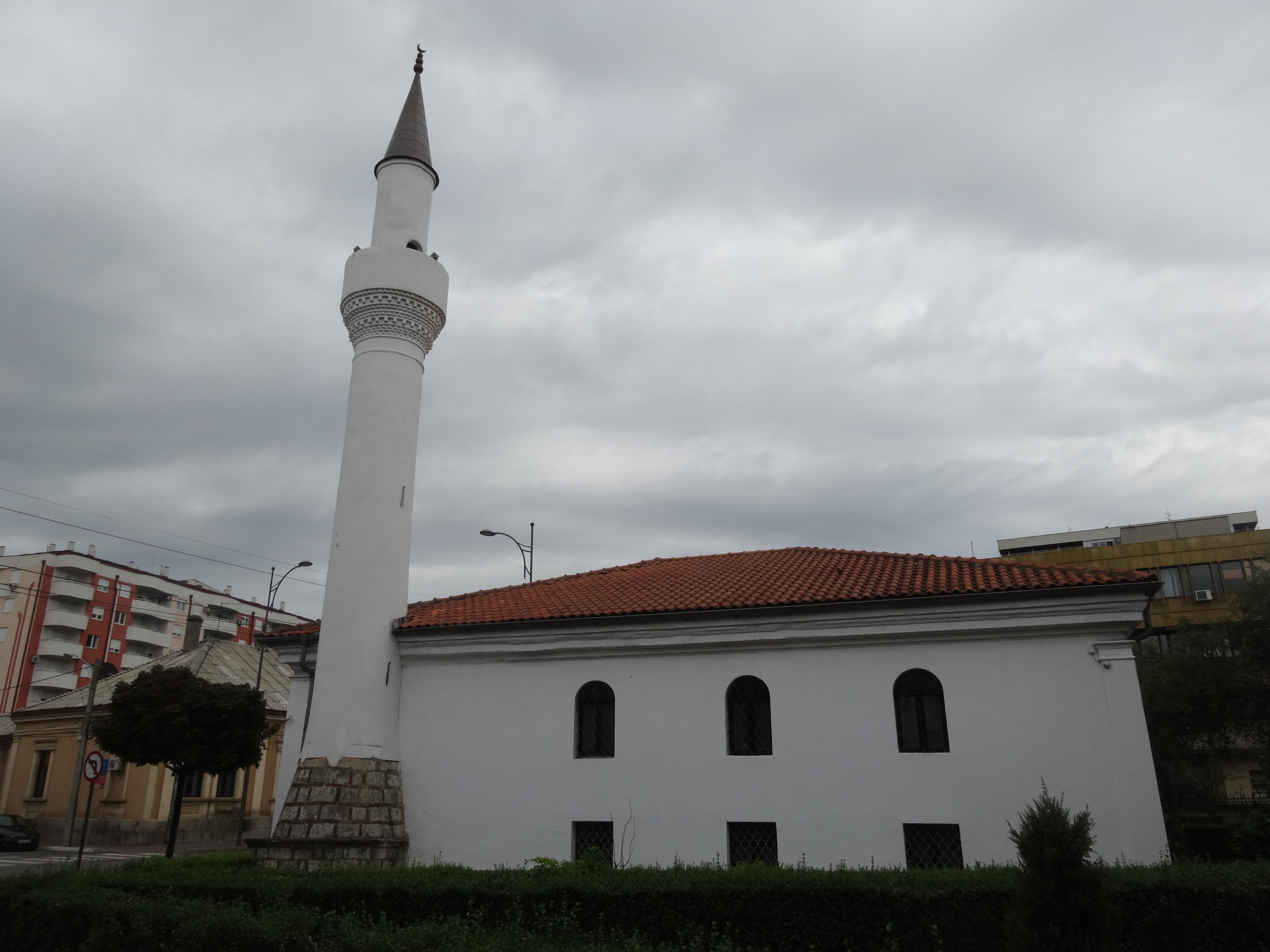
Islam-aga's Mosque in Niš, 1720

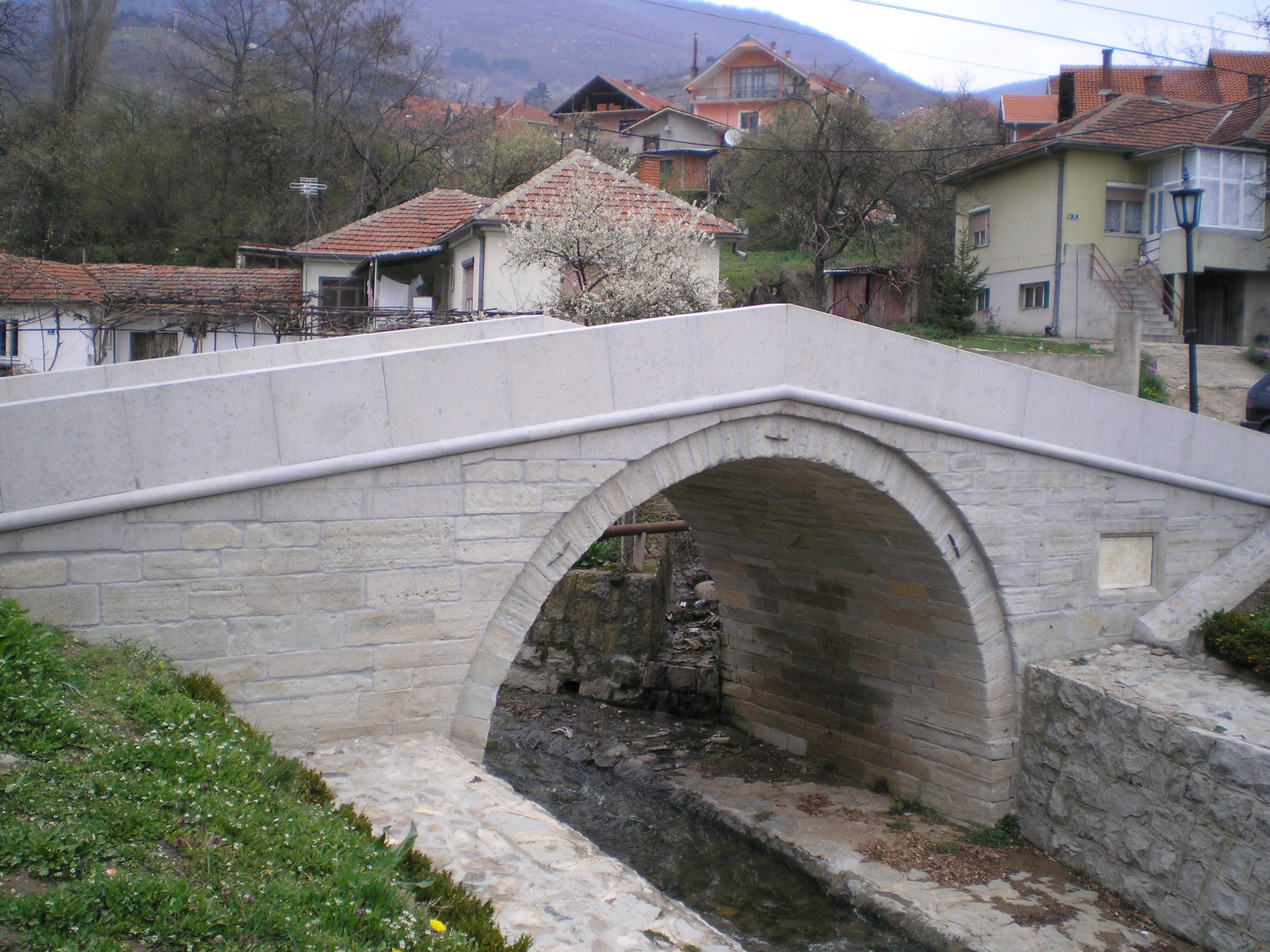
White Bridge in Vranje, 1844

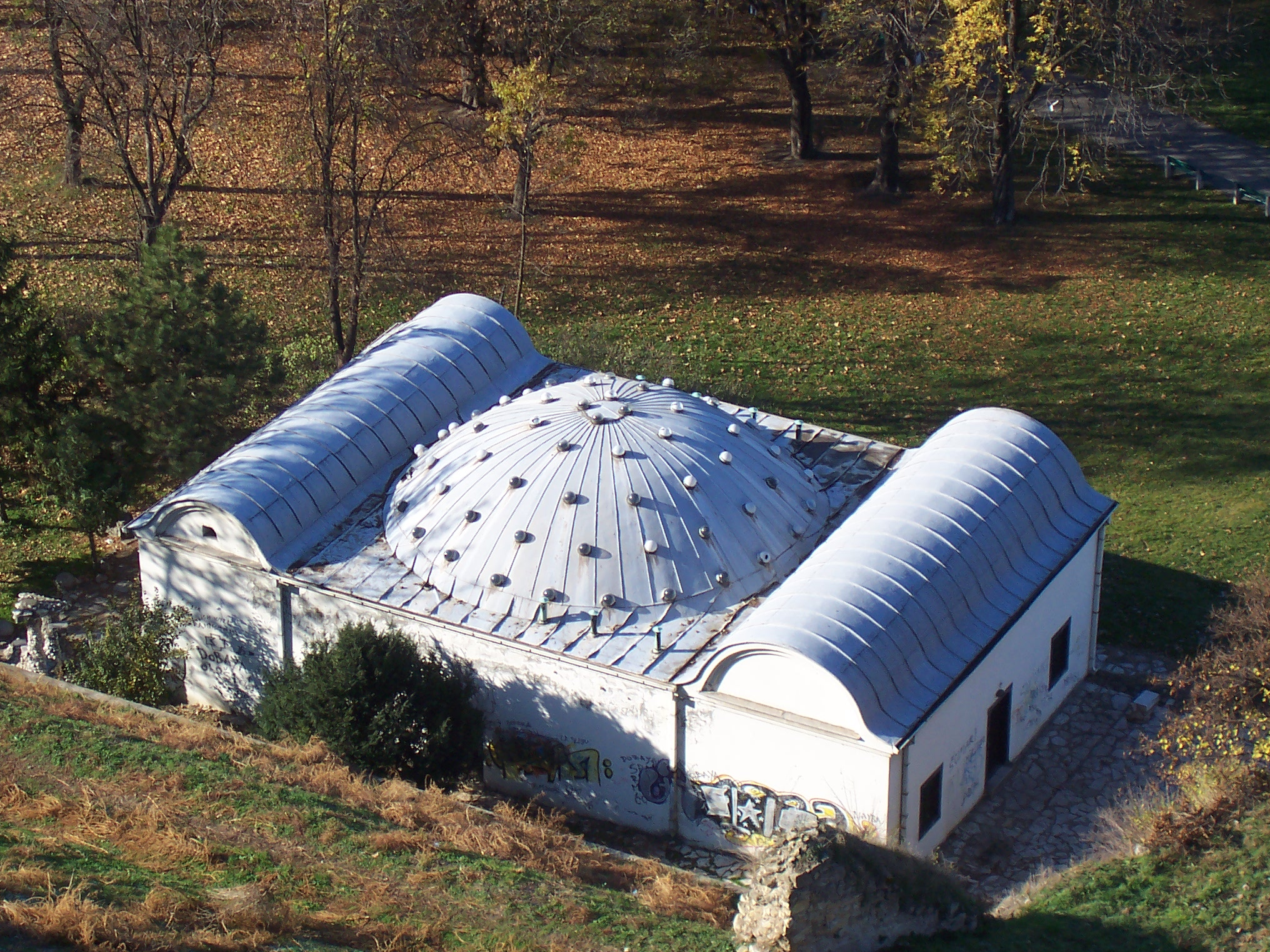
Belgrade Planetarium, 1867

==== Konak Style ====
The Konak (word from Turkish – palace) was represented for most of the 18th century and early 19th century, most notably the end of the Ottoman presence and autonomy of the Principality of Serbia.

Homes and manor houses of wealthier individuals in Serbia during Ottoman rule have distinct Turkish-style in their design. These konaks would fall from style in the later half of the 19th century, due to Serbia's independence from the Ottoman Empire and the shift to more western European trends in culture and architecture. Very few examples of Ottoman architecture survived after the 19th century due to this shift in culture and architectural appeal, mostly preserved in southern Serbia. Cities like Vranje, Prizren, Priština, Novi Pazar, Belgrade, and Kragujevac showcase preserved Konak architecture.

In general, buildings of this period include a basement and two floors, with some examples of buildings with one floor such as Stari Han in Kosjerić built in 1854. The walls are pierced by many windows arranged symmetrically. The façade is decorated with one or two bay windows, overlooking the street and expanded interior space, while the courtyard façade is decorated with a balcony. The court, located at the rear of the manor, is fenced by high walls.

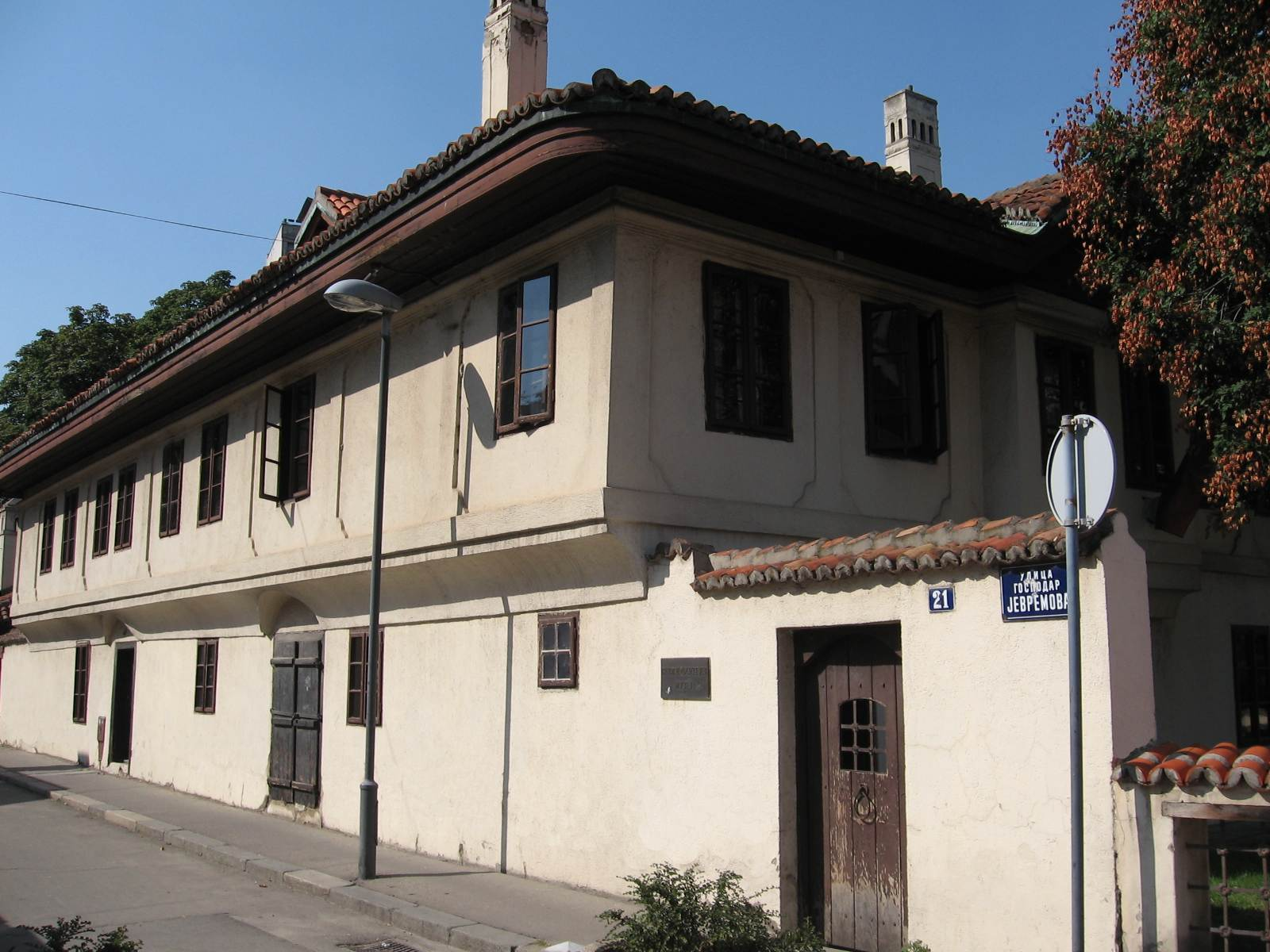
Building of the Museum of Vuk and Dositej in Belgrade, 1739

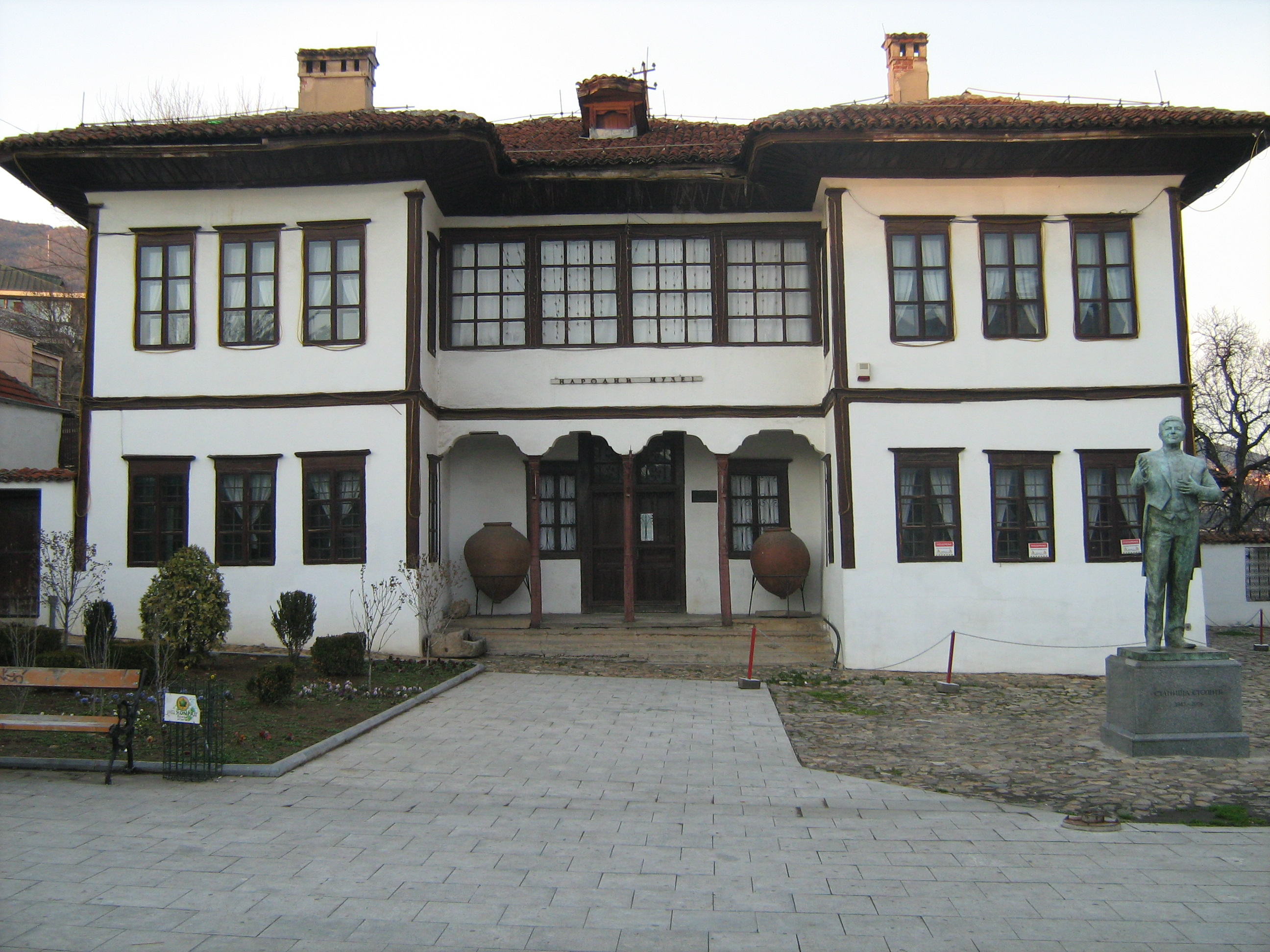
Pasha's Residence in Vranje, 1765

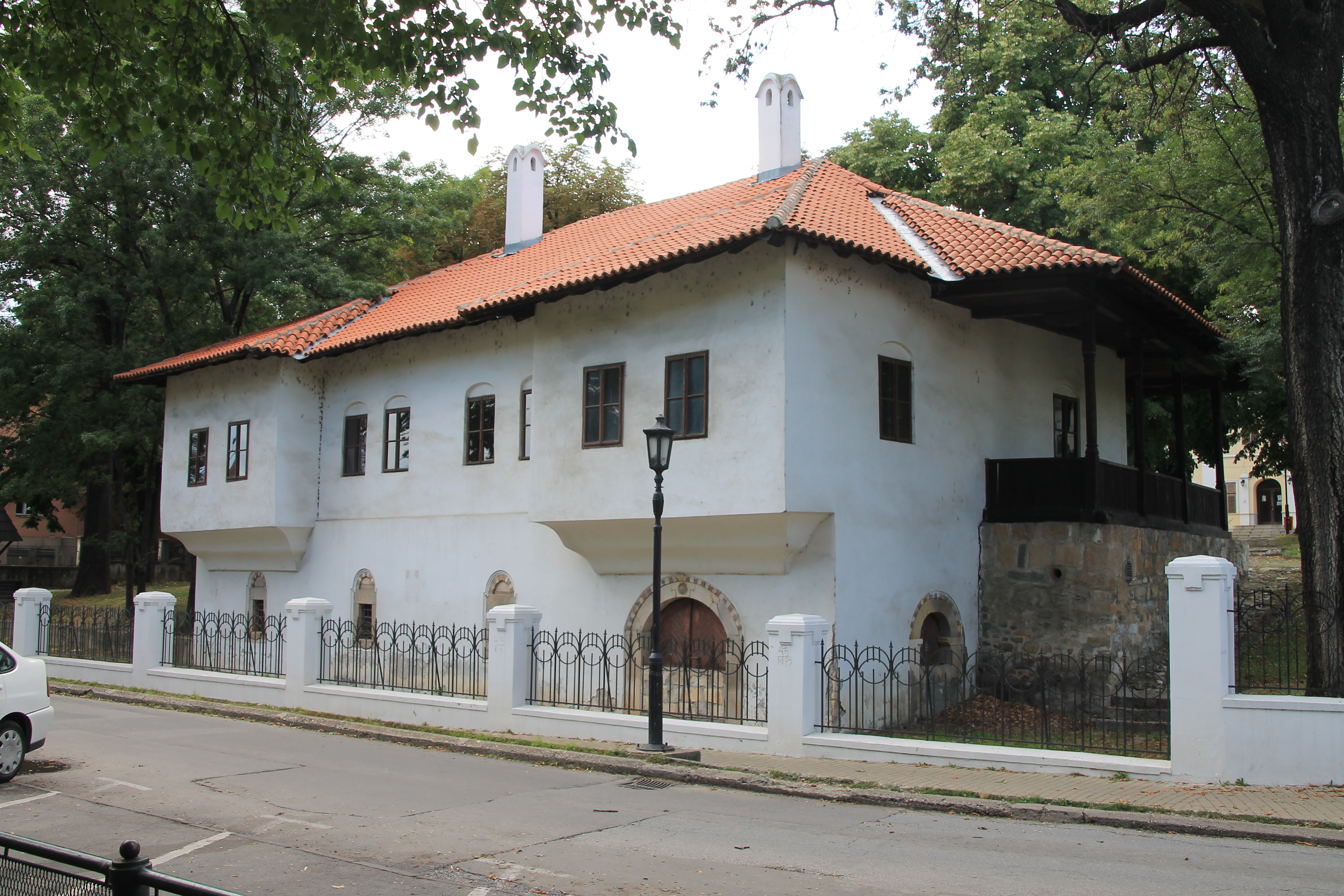
Amidža Residence in Kragujevac, 1824

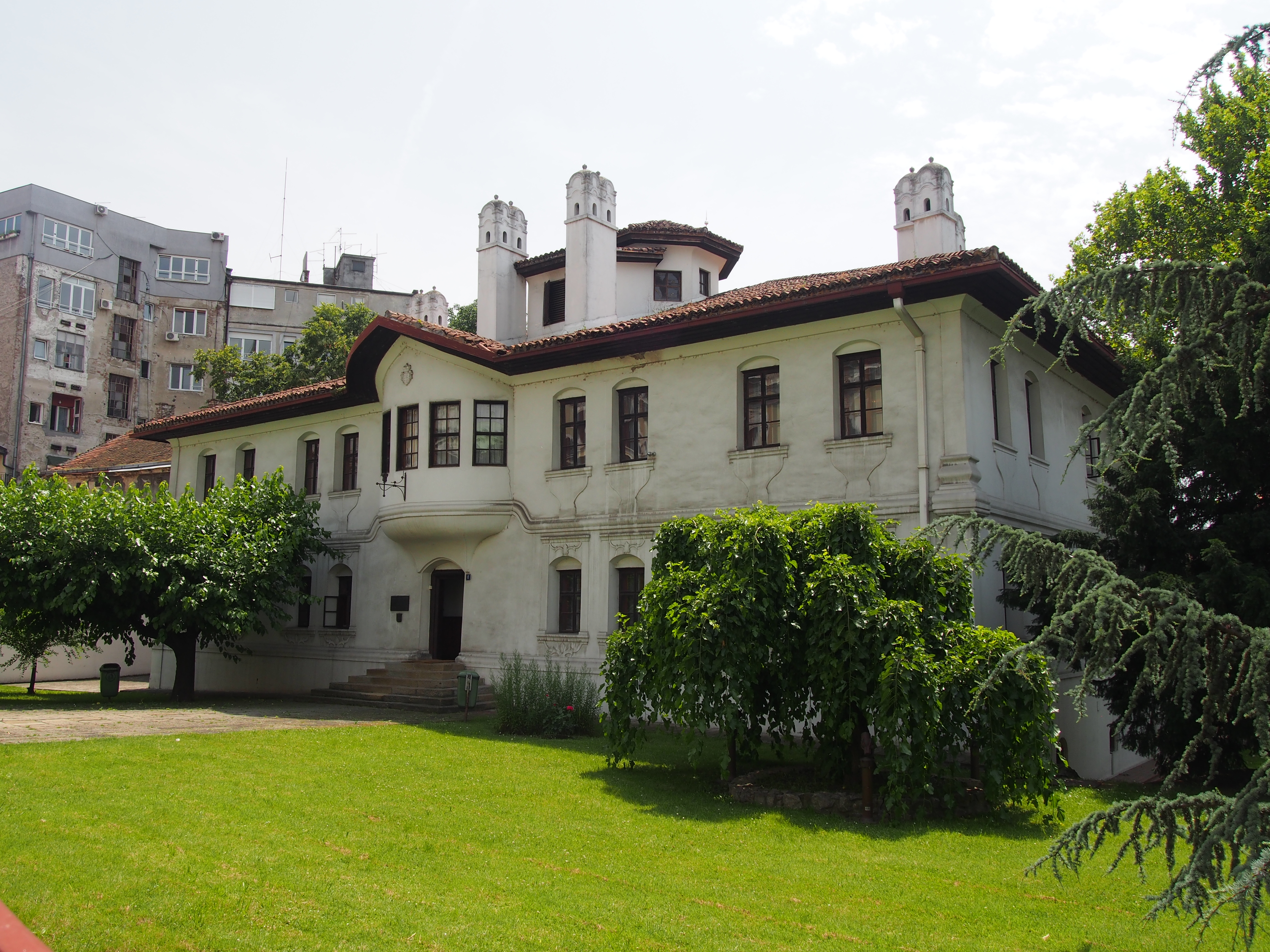
Princess Ljubica's Residence in Belgrade, 1830

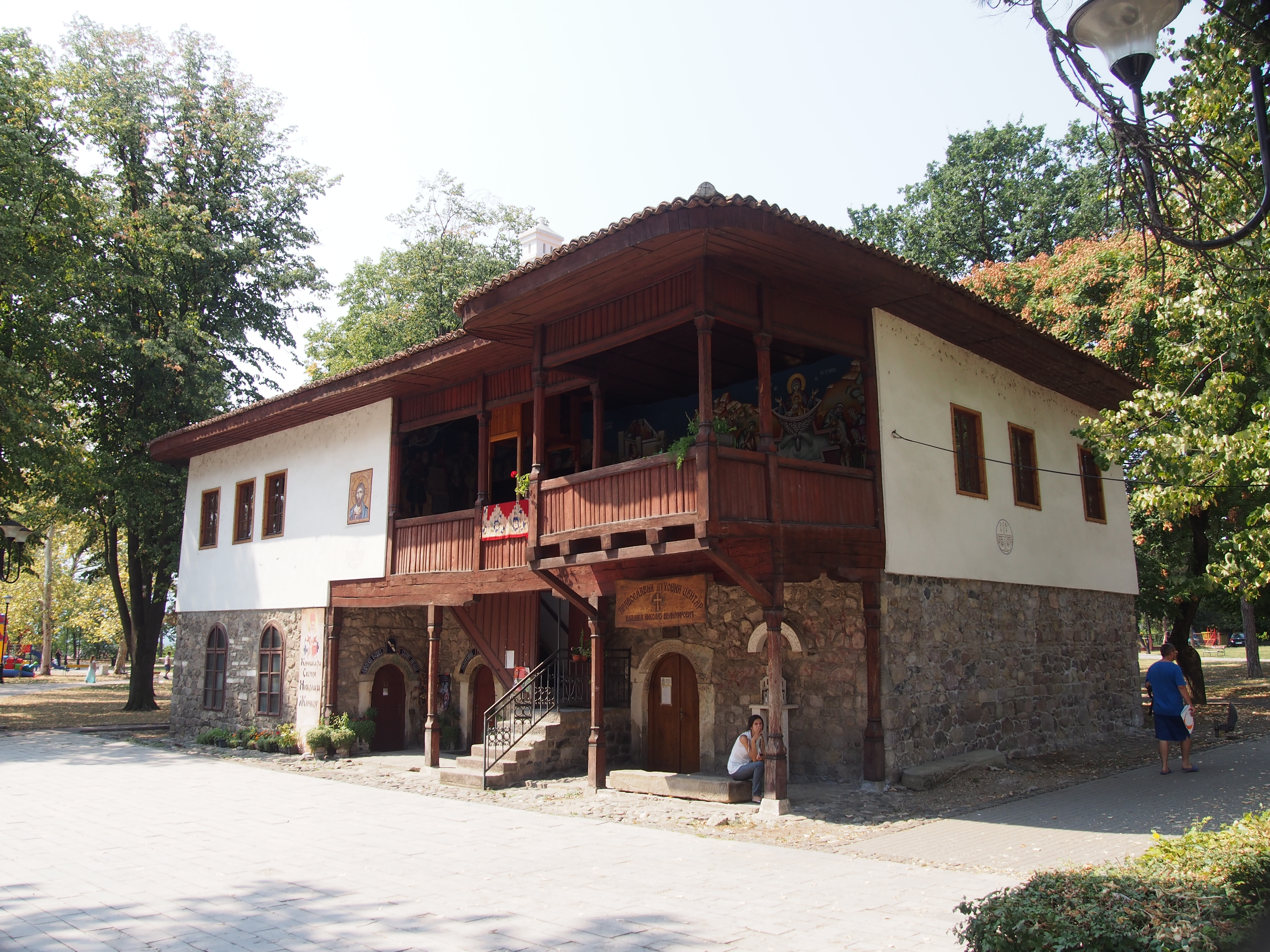
Master Vasin's Residence in Kraljevo, 1830

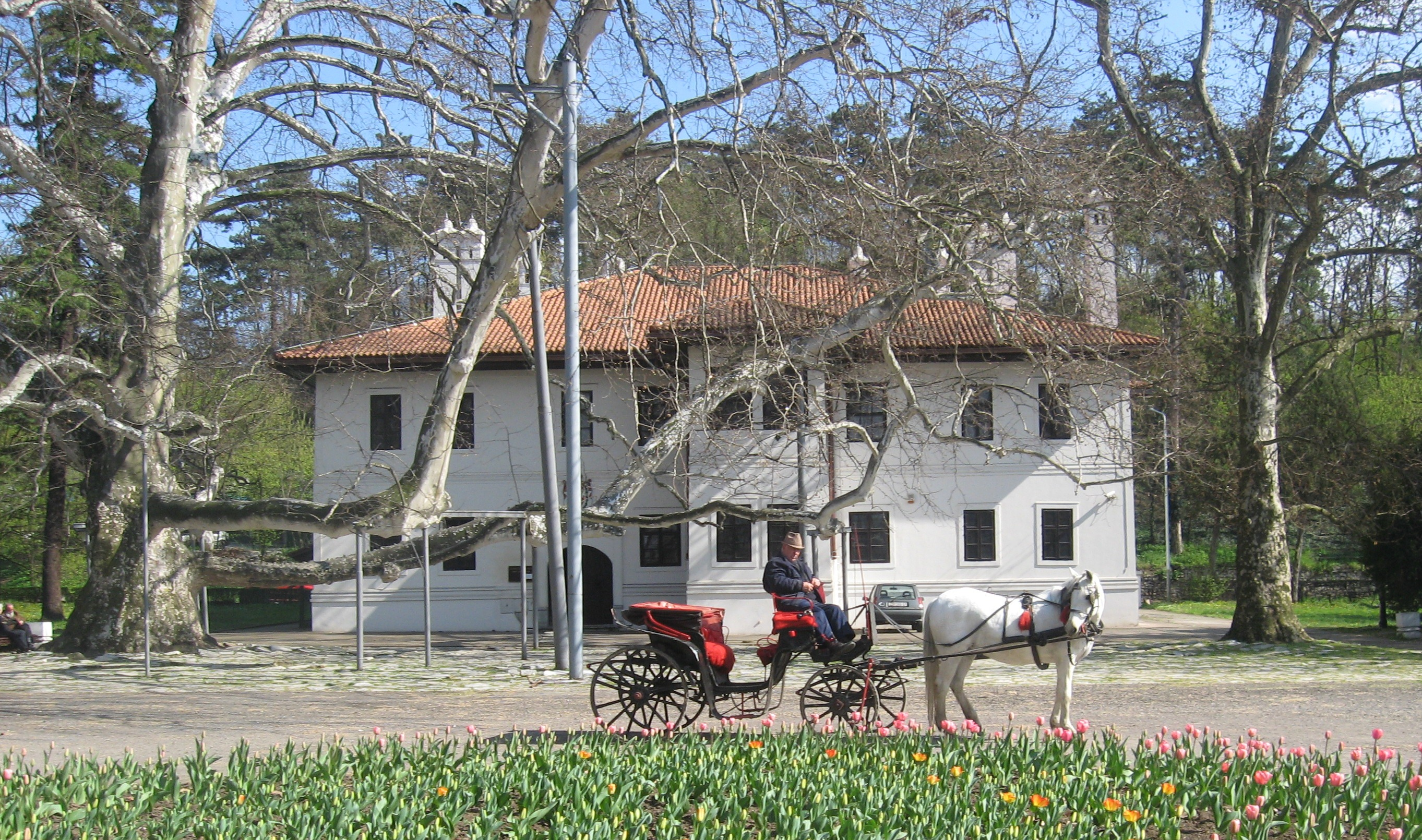
Prince Miloš' Residence in Topčider, Belgrade, 1833

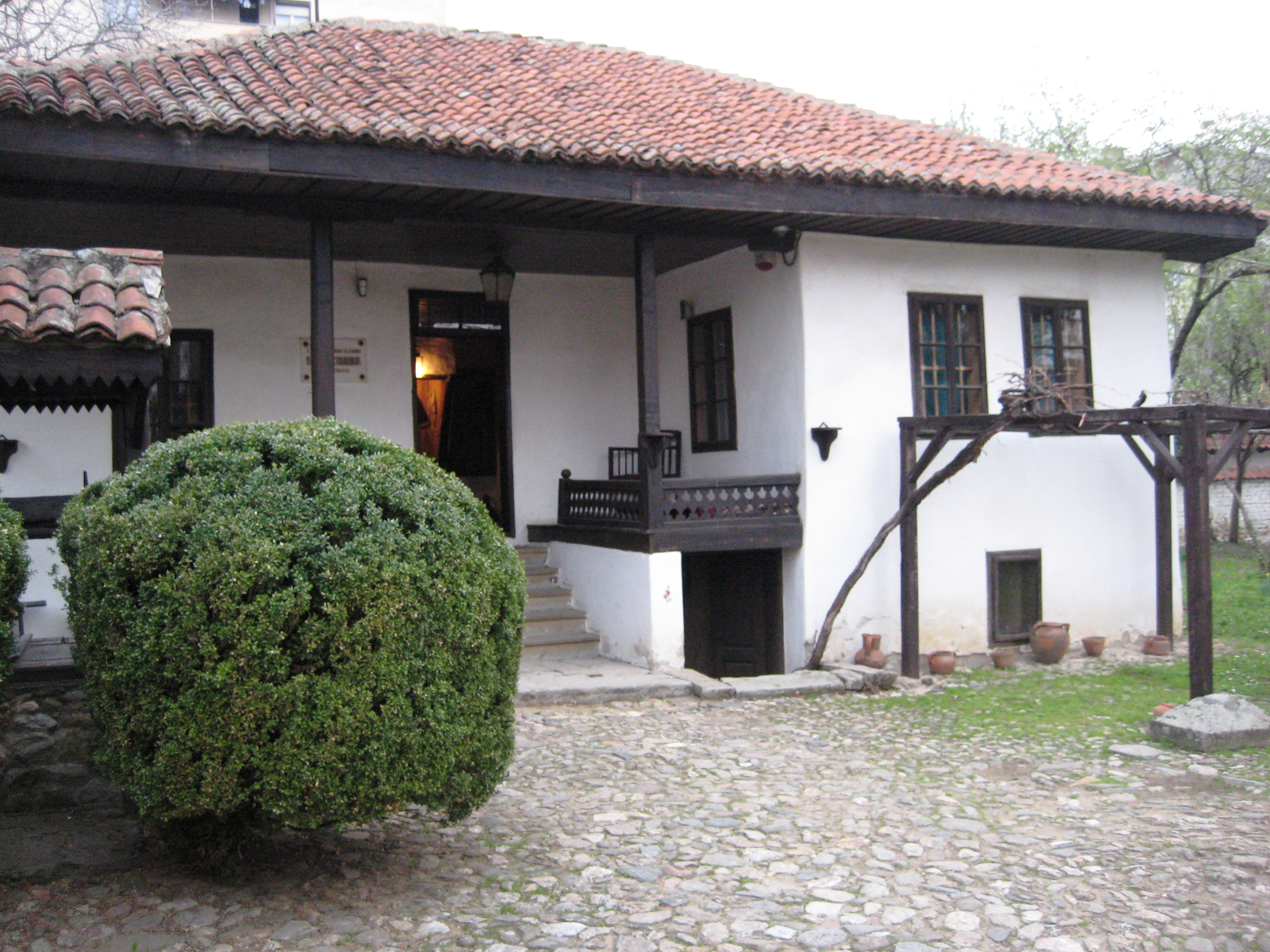
House of Borisav Stanković in Vranje, 1855

=== Folk and Vernacular Styles ===
Folk and vernacular architecture from Serb villages remains relatively preserved and recreated in several instances. The southern architectural styles typically features wooden structures, sometimes plastered, typically secluded villages where Ottoman influence was less prevalent. These types of villages date from between 14th to 19th centuries.

In contemporary Serbia, most of these types of villages are open-air museums ("ethno villages"), showcasing what life was like prior to westernization and industrialization.

The method of construction in Serbian rural architecture were based on the experience of Serbian farmers, self-taught builders, who choose the best solutions and adjusted their houses to their life and work. This was not only expressed by the disposition of basic layout, format and organization of residential homes and commercial buildings, but also in the construction and the details. It was not based on fashionable developments in architecture and urbanism.

According of needs and lifestyle of the farmer, there were various types of houses:

- The unicellular houses in which the farmer shared the space with its cattle and the fireplace was located in the middle of the room with no chimney
- The two-room houses (this was the most popular type) were the living space was divided from a backroom and the animals were located in stalls
- More-room houses, where more rooms and a porch were added to the two room form (typical for the Vojvodina region)

==== Brvnara and Bondruka Styles ====
The log cabin Brvnara with straw- or shingles-roof is found mostly in forested and mountainous areas like Zlatibor and Tara region in Western Serbia (and in general in the dinaric alps – Western part of Serbian Kraijna, Bosnia, Eastern Montenegro). The luscious pine forests supply with good building material. Usually it has an elongated form, stands on a stone cellar and is placed orthogonally to the steep terrain and shows the cellar (izba) on the downhill side. Also typical is the huge pyramidal high-hipped roof placed on a relative low cubus of the cottage. Usually different cottages are placed together and build a harmonious looking homestead.

The Log cabin Bondruka is the most popular rural house in the Balkan region, typical for Serbia south of the Danube, and is a further evolution of the log-cabin design seen with Brvnara style. The construction is of wooden skeleton walls filled with mud and reef and plastered with mud on the outside and with plaster on the interior walls. The roof is a hiproof (4-sided roof), covered with slightly curved roof tiles. On steep terrains the cellar is made of stones to level out the differences in height.

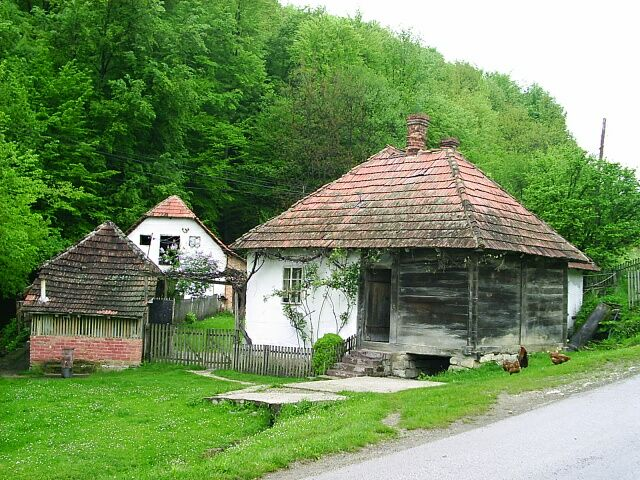
Koštunići, between 14th and 19th century

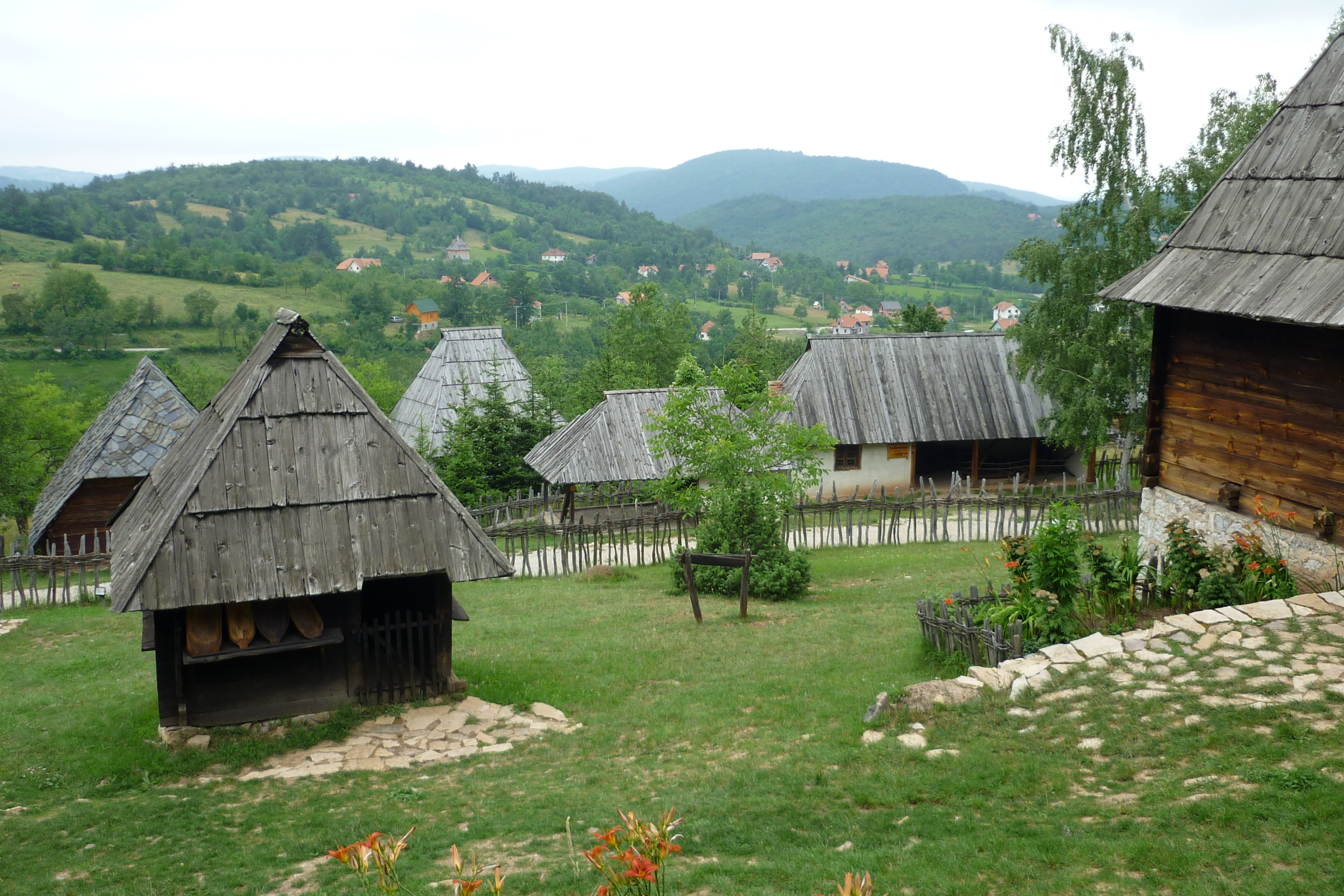
Sirogojno, between 18th and 19th century

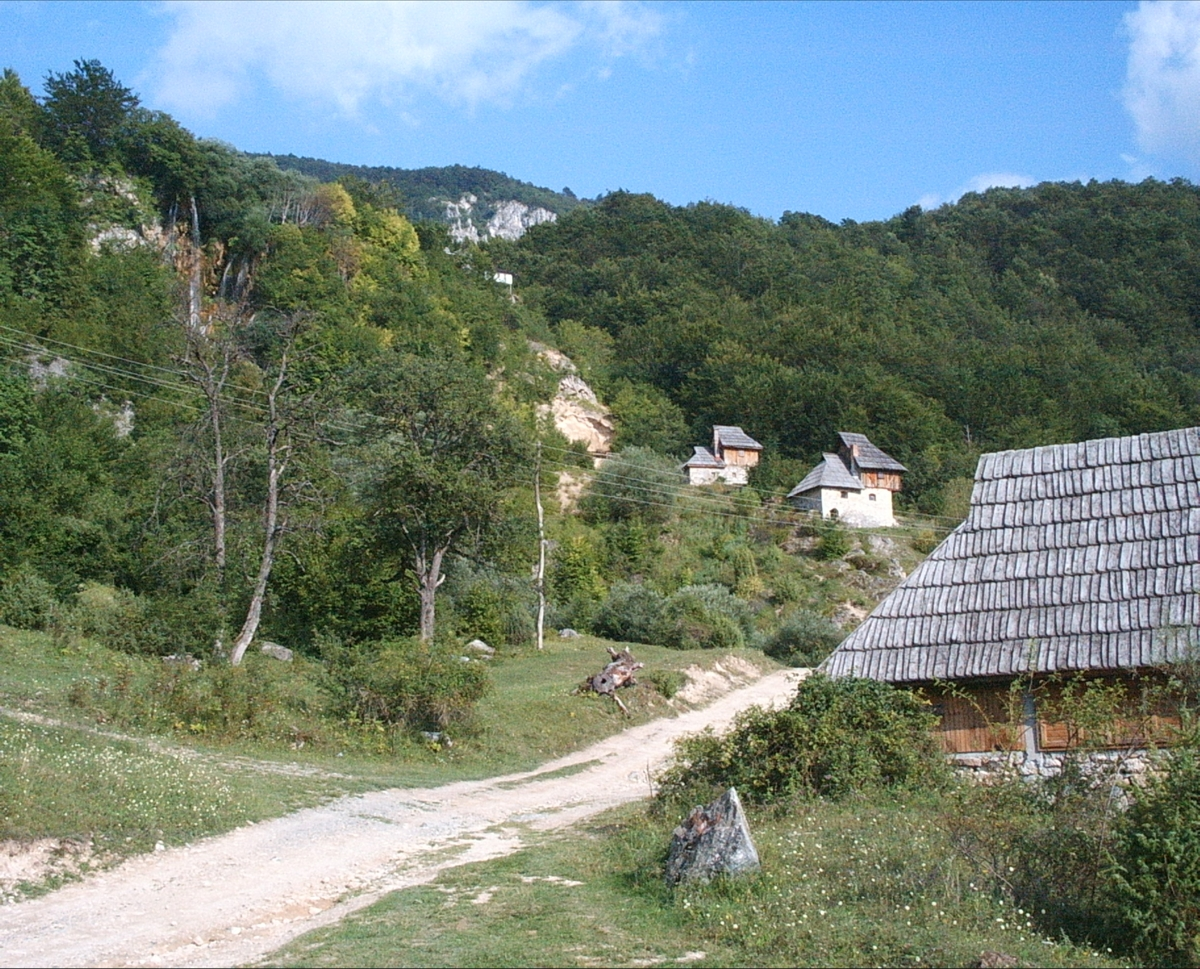
Sopotnica village and old watermill

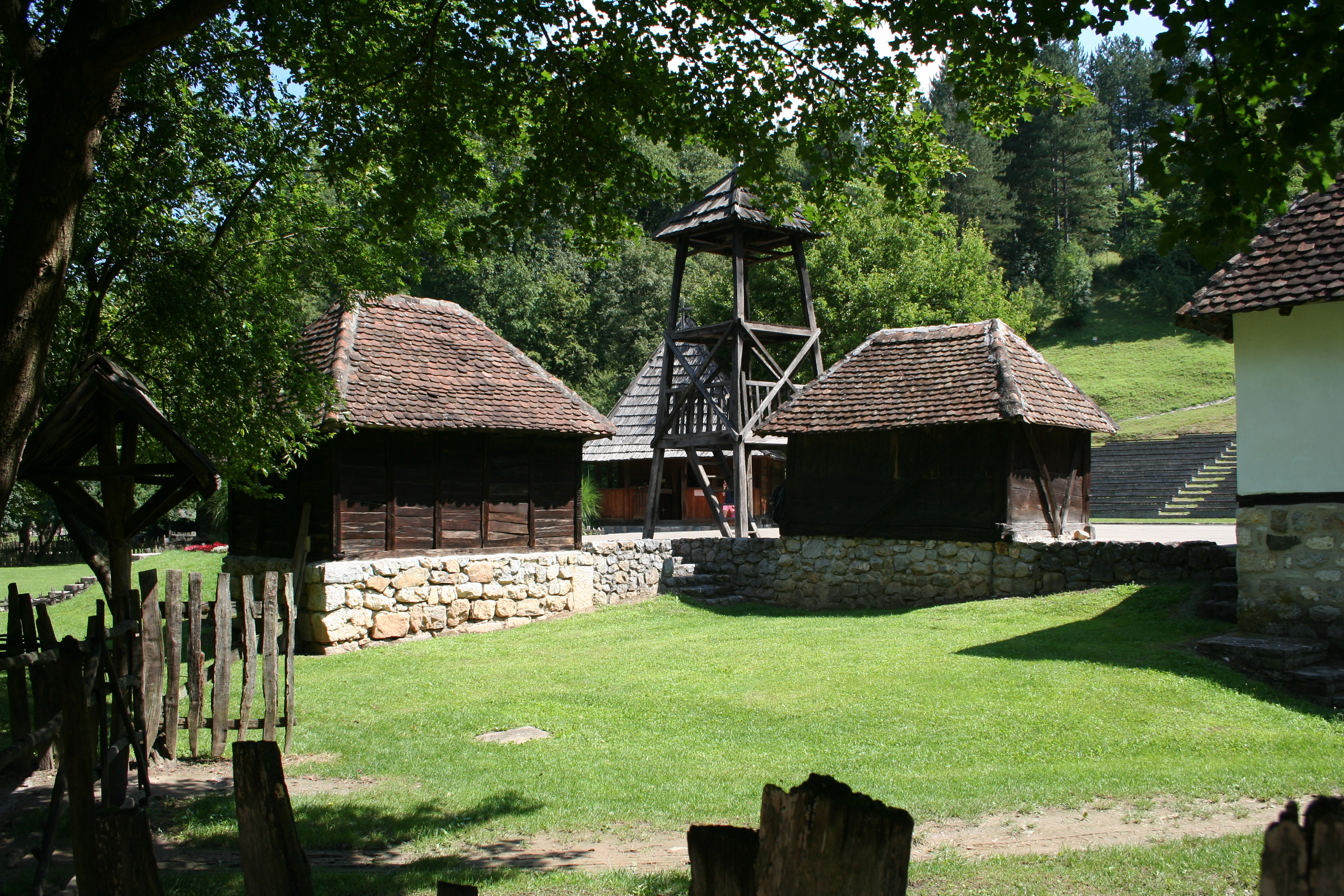
Tršić village, 19th century

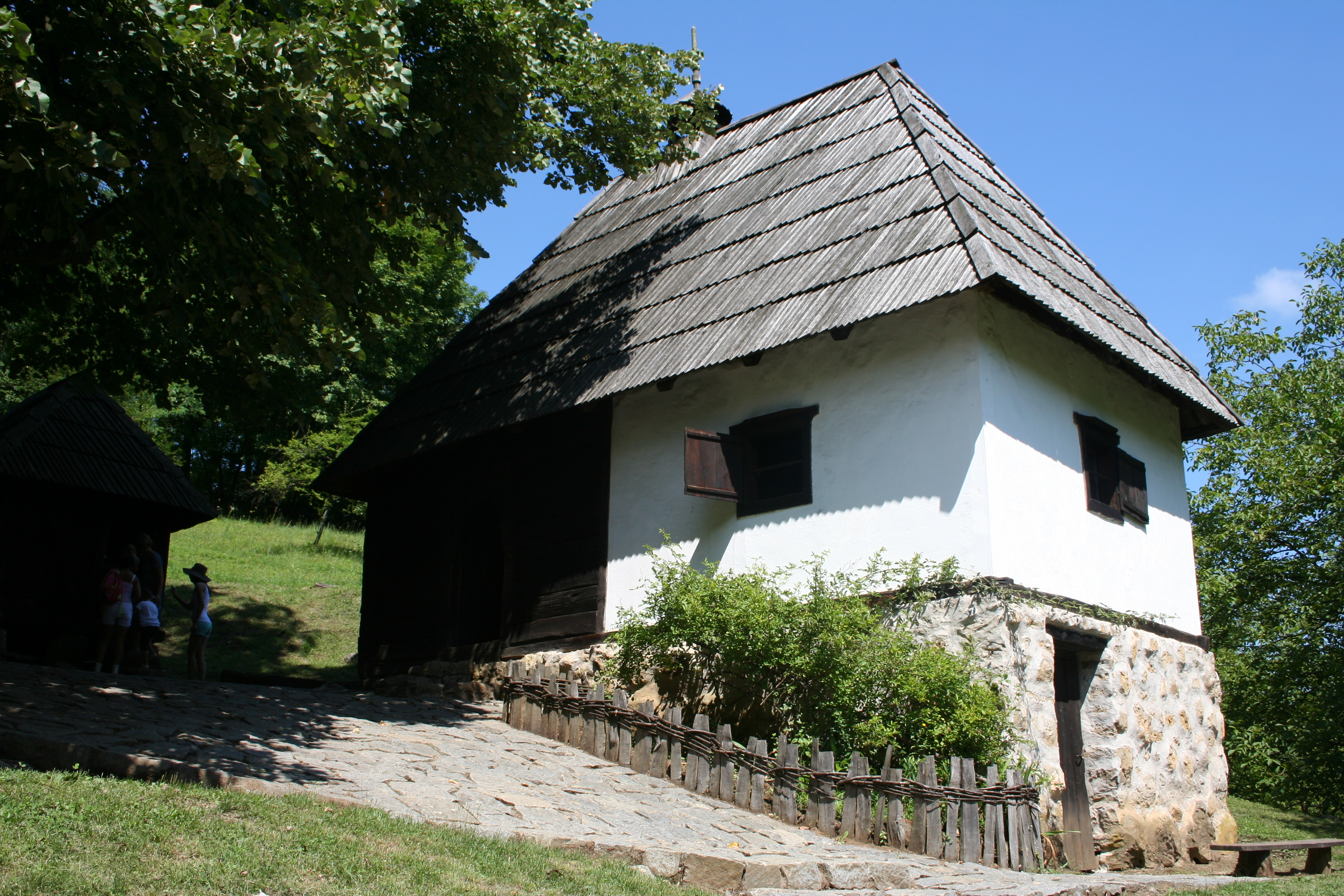
House of Vuk Stefanović Karadžić in Tršić village

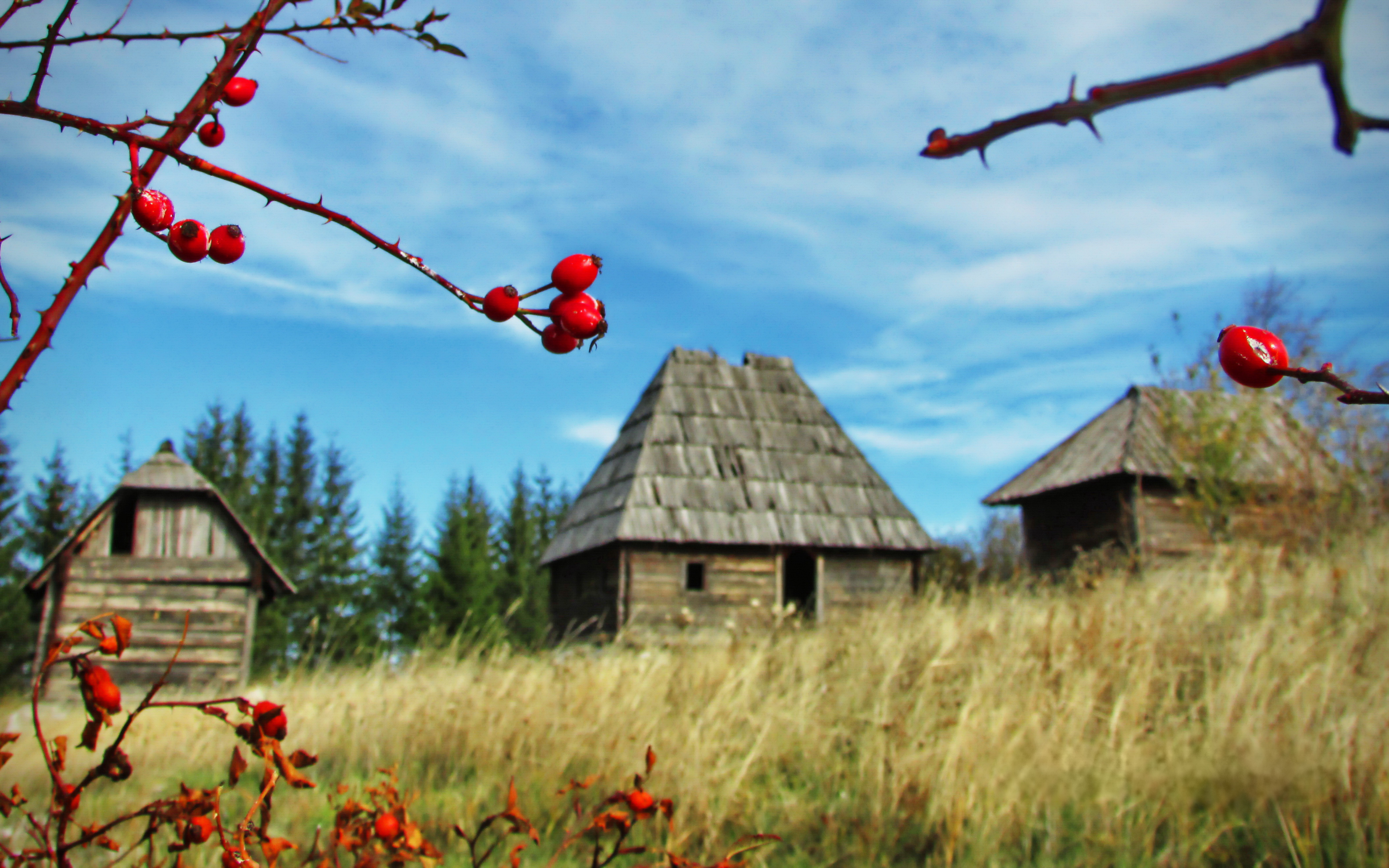
Cottages in Tara National Park, 19th century

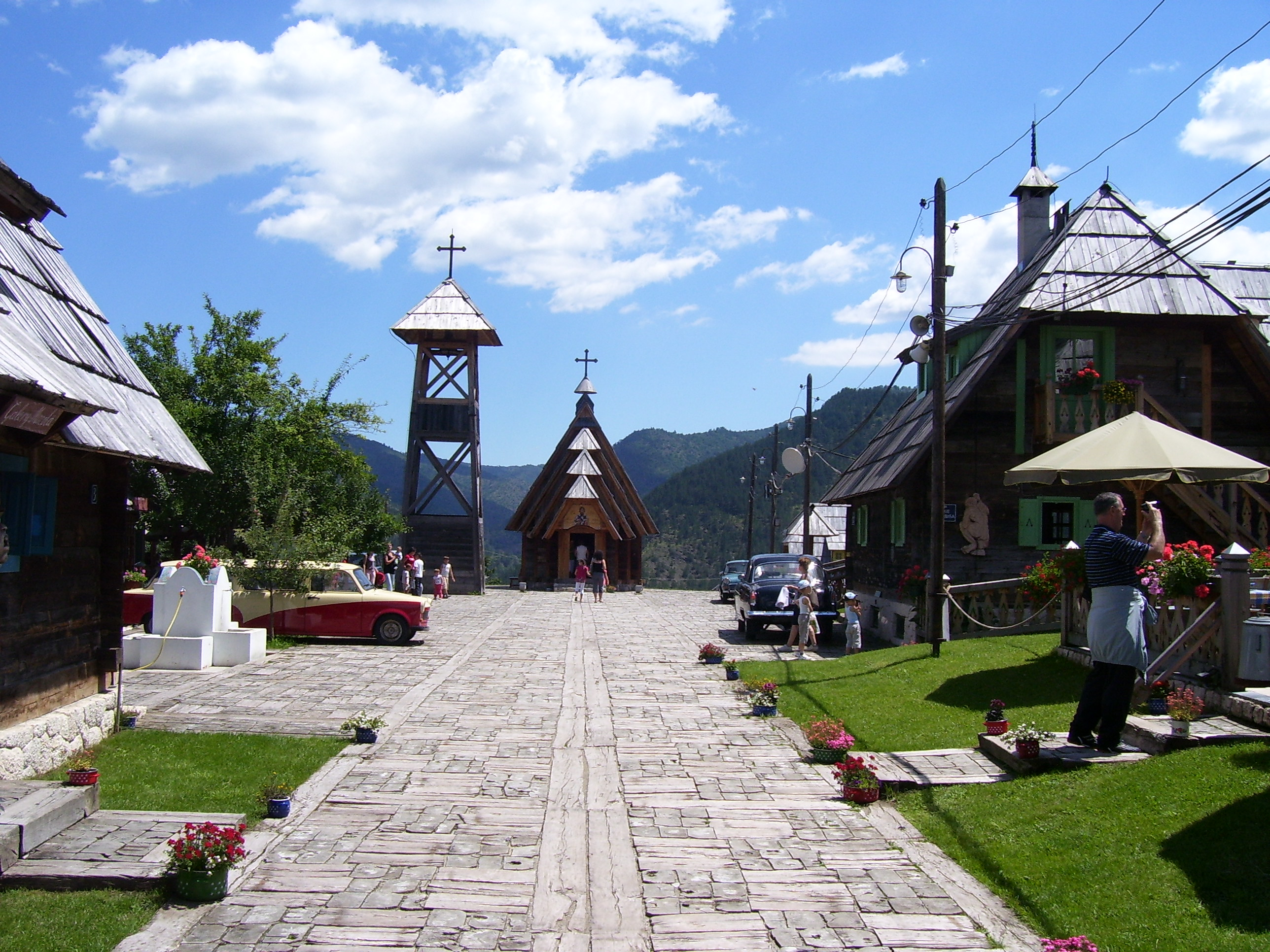
Küstendorf ethno village recreation by Emir Kusturica near Mokra Gora, 2004

==== Wooden and Tree Churches ====
Southern Serbia also has a wide array of wooden churches built during the 18th and 19th centuries. Built similarly to Brvnara log cabins, they use local wood materials in construction, with a simple rectangular shape, with the exception of the oval entrance area, curving the threshold and roof, and topped with a simple wooden cross. The shingles are made of large wooden plates. The church bell is usually place outside next to the church on a wooden built tower.

These are also areas where Zapis, sacred trees in Serbian traditions, originated and are widely practiced, due to most churches and places of Christian worship being demolished by the Ottomans. Today it is a common tradition among the Serbian Orthodox representatives in local communities to pick sacred trees, conserving and protecting them in the process. There are also examples of living sacred trees being carved for decades to create makeshift churches, such as the Zapis in Jovac village near Vladičin Han by Dragoljub Krstić in 1991. Dedicated to St Pantelejmon, the small church was intentionally built in an oak tree, which holds great significance in both Christian and Pagan Serbian culture and mythology.

There are also examples of wooden mosques designed in a similar fashion located in Bosnia and Herzegovina.

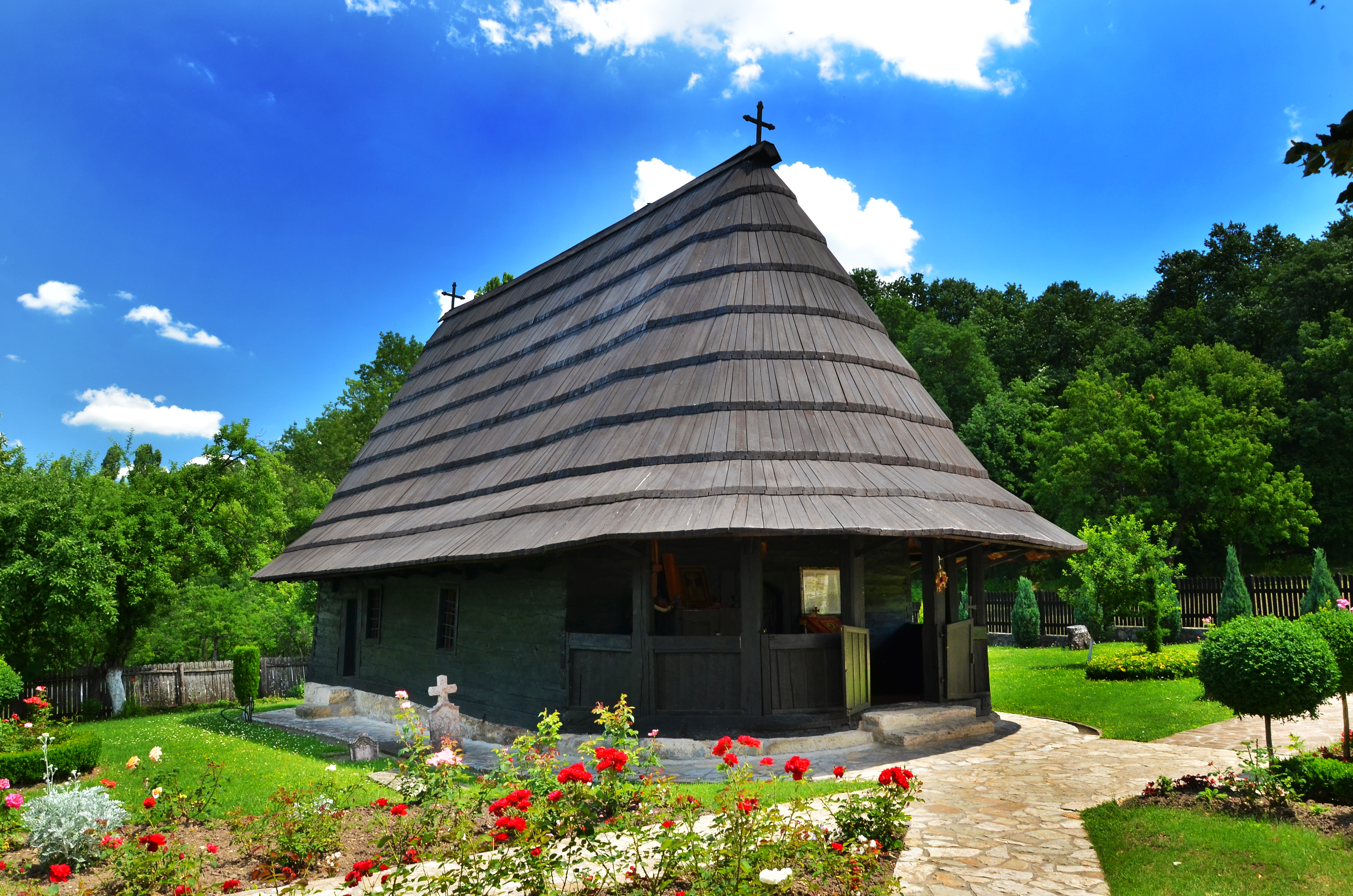
Wooden Orthodox Church of Pokajnica Monastery in Staro Selo

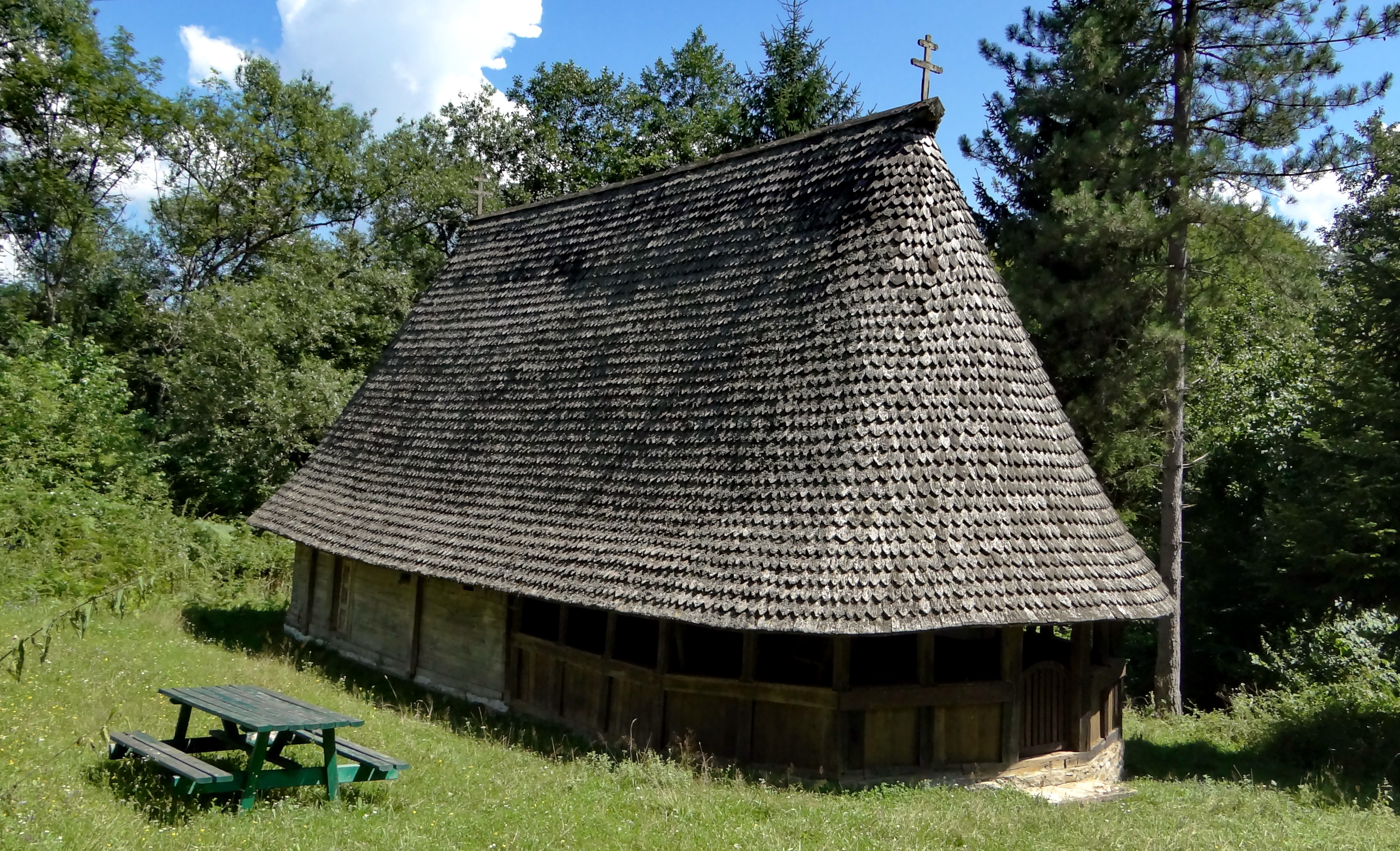
Wooden Orthodox Church in Dub, 1792

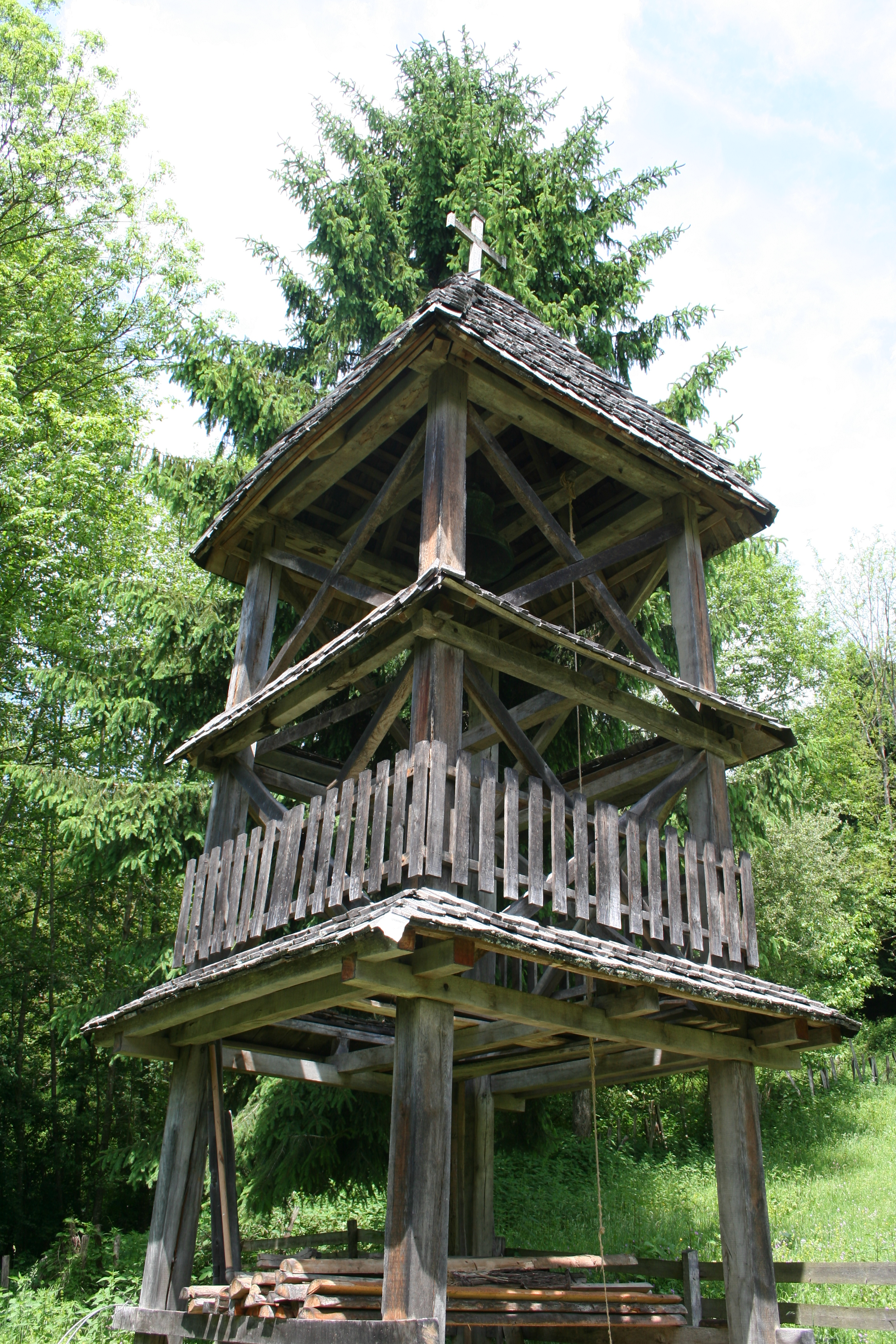
Bell tower of the Wooden Church in Dub

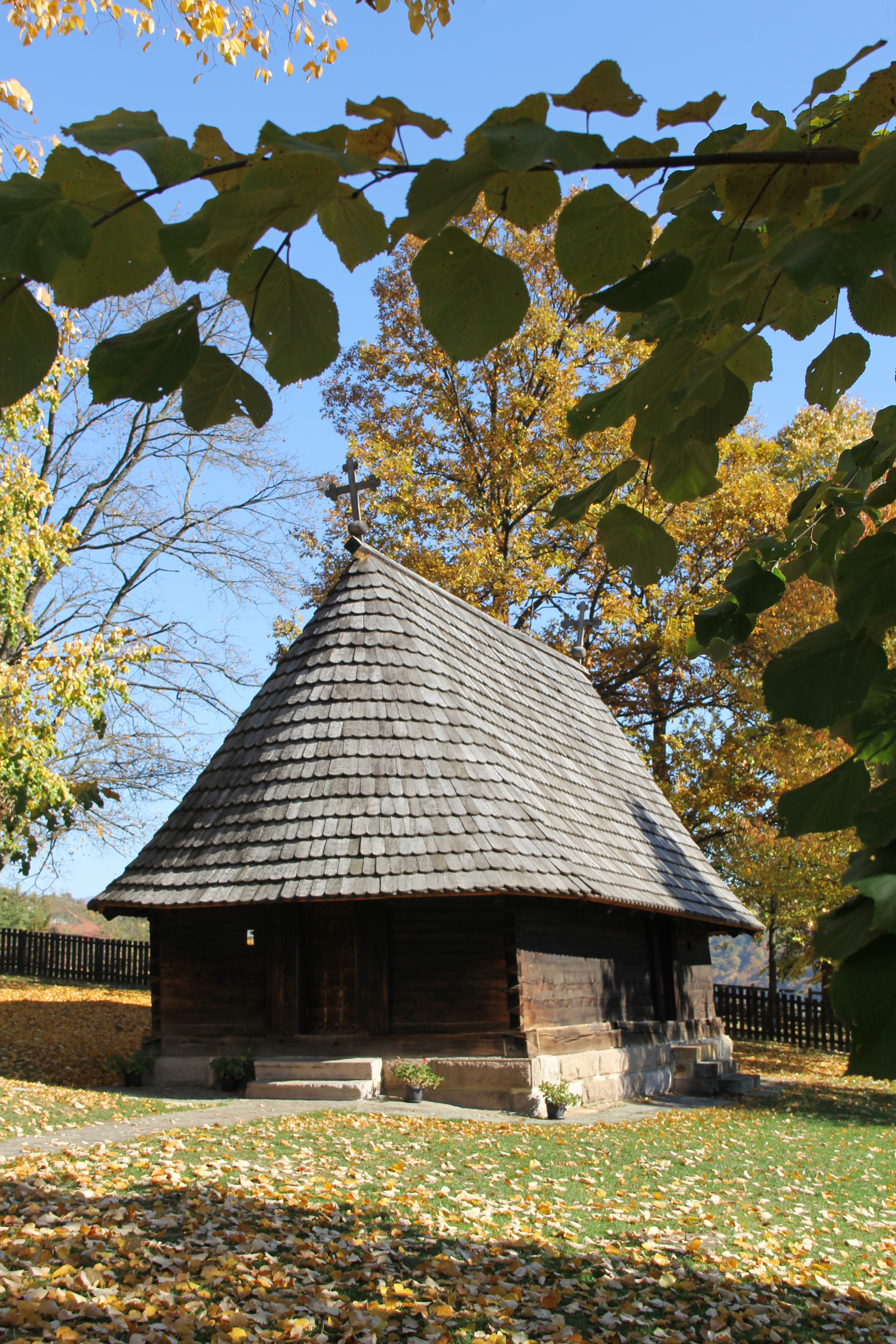
Wooden Orthodox Church of Saint George in Takovo, 1795

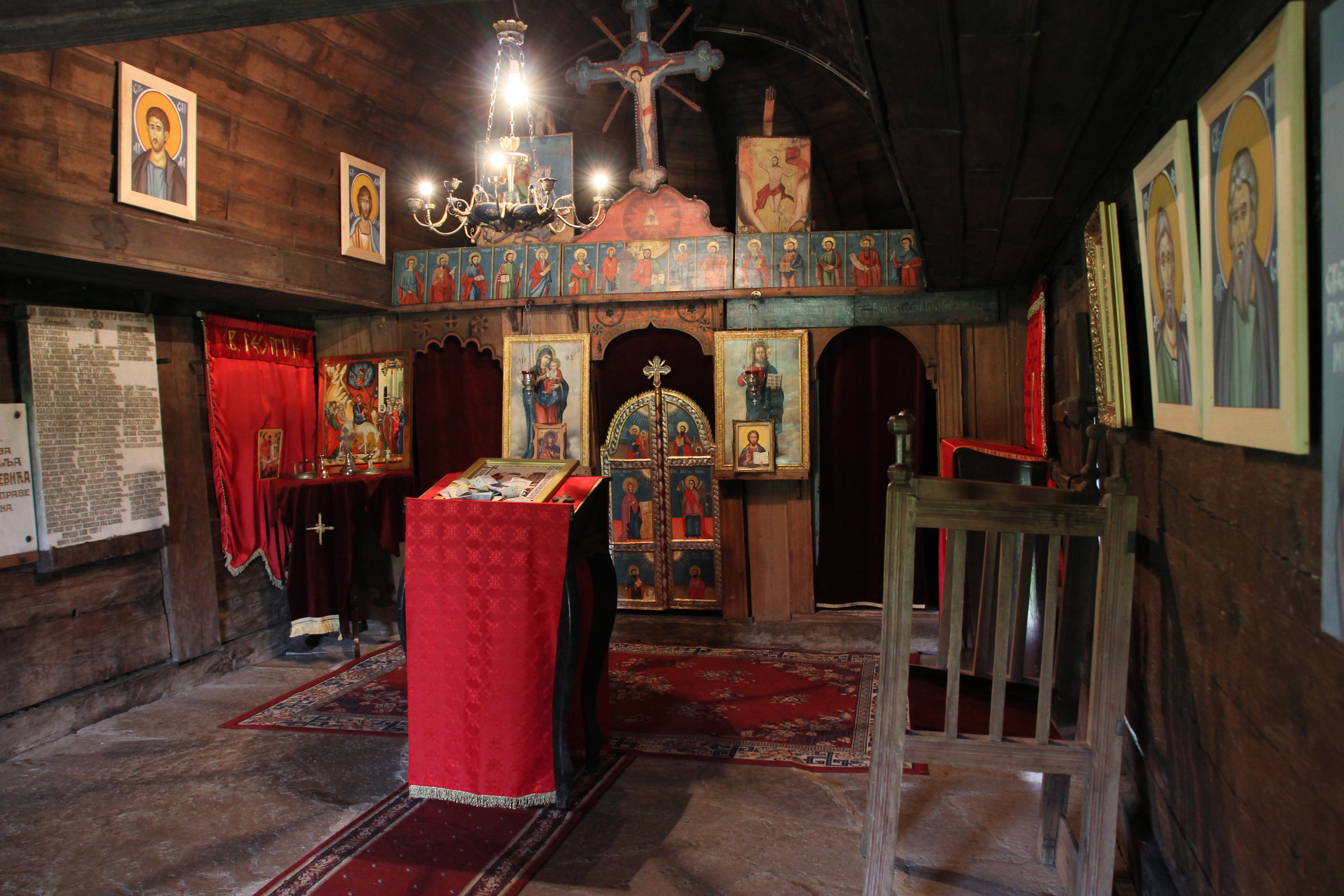
Interior of the Wooden Church in Takovo

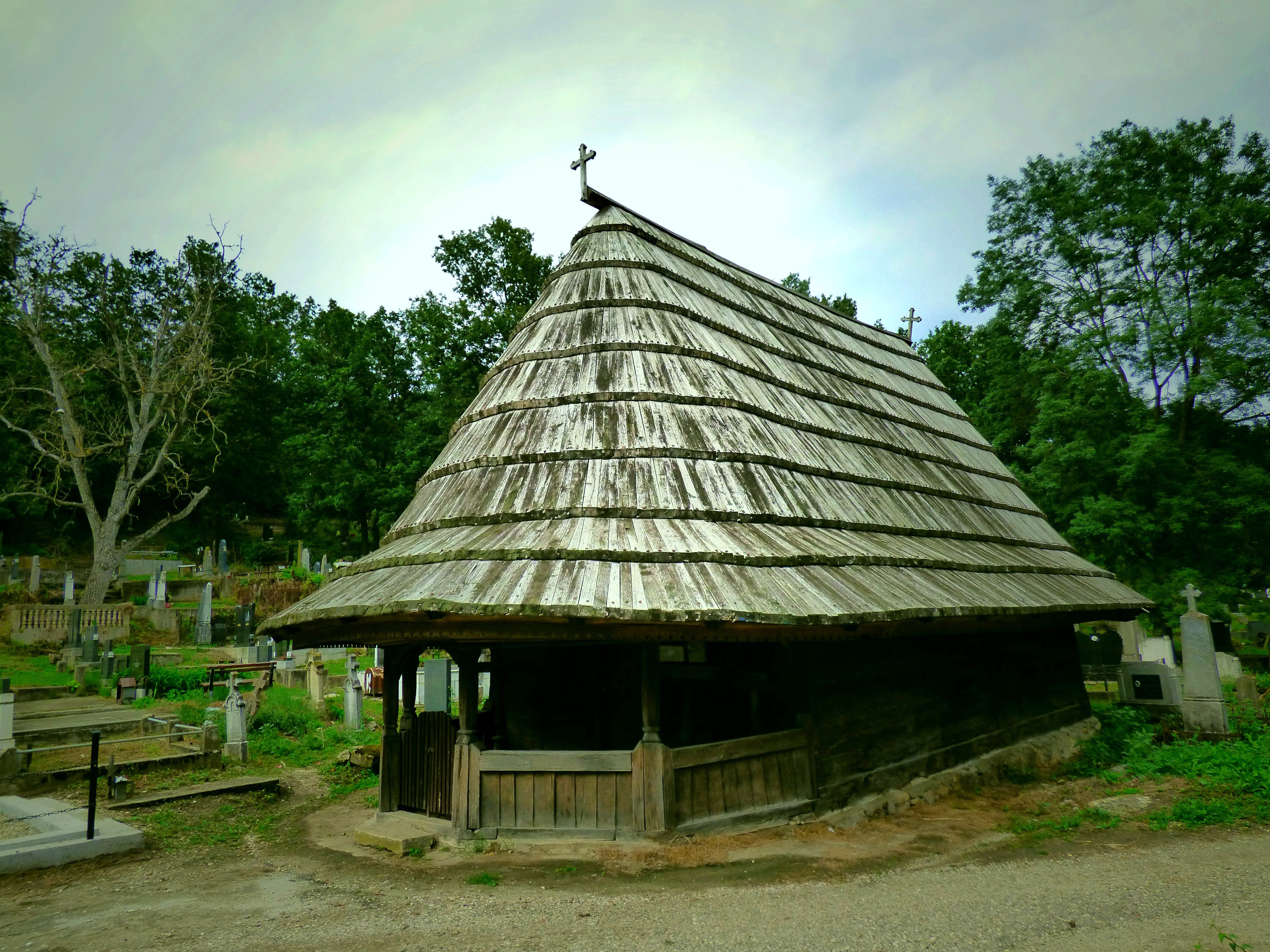
Wooden Orthodox Church of Archangel Michael in Rača, 1826

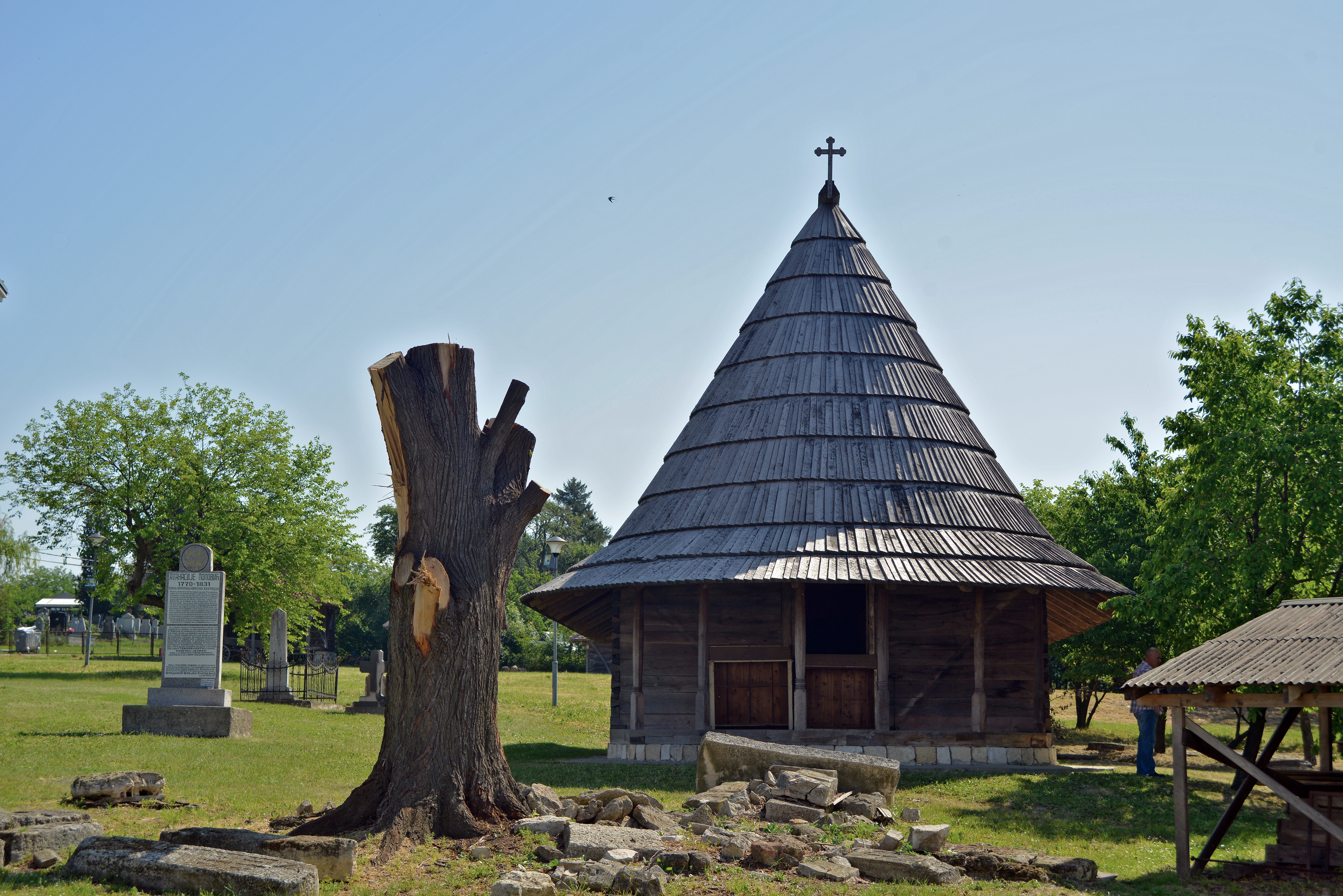
Orthodox Wooden Church of Forty martyrs in the churchyard of the Elijah the Prophet church in Vranić

==== Pannonian and Salaš Styles ====
Vojvodina houses (or Pannonian houses) are the typical village and town residential buildings in the flat Vojvodina region. The layout of villages is orthogonally structured and houses are laid perpendicular to the street. They are organized with a front room (living-space) a backroom (sleeping place) and a kitchen (with fireplace) just after the front porch. Between the houses lays the garden and the yard. Influenced by Austro-Hungarian Empire these houses were often decorated in Art-Nouveau and Baroque-Style, distanced from typical vernacular architecture. Most of these types of houses would evolve into the many manor houses of wealthy individuals scattered across Vojvodina.

Salaš are traditional type of farms in Vojvodina province (particularly Bačka and Srem) prior to the mid-19th century, with some farms and villages recreating and preserving salaš aesthetic for village tourism. They use local materials such as mud, bricks, wood, and reed, with finer details crafted and built by traditional artists often utilizing motifs of the many different ethnic groups of Vojvodina. Some Vojvodina cities and towns still showcase salaš architecture, ether through preserved houses or museum models such as those in the Museum of Vojvodina in Novi Sad. In contemporary Serbia, most of these types of farms are open-air museums, restaurants, and/or hotels, showcasing what life was like in this region prior to mass industrialization.

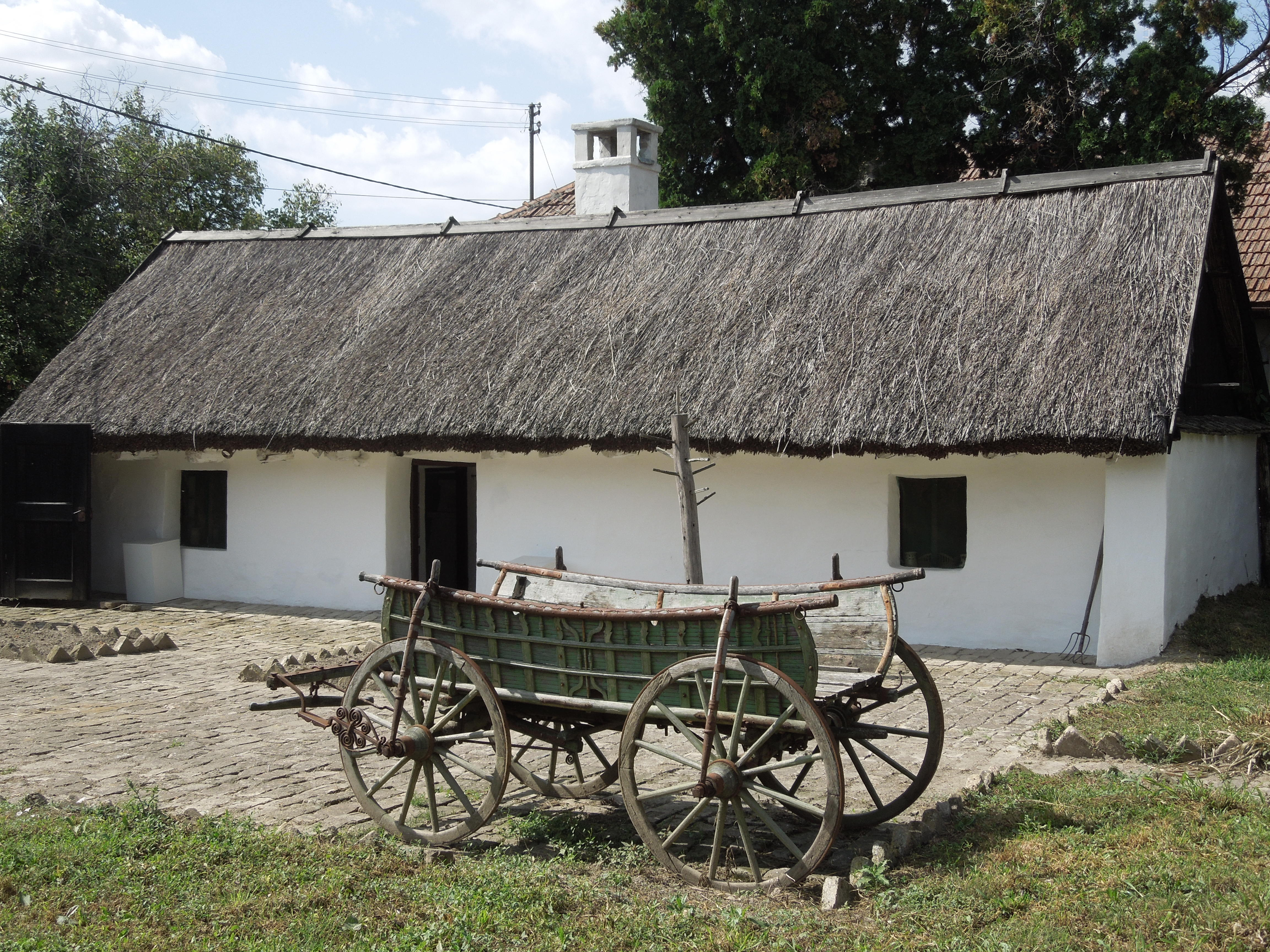
Salaš in Bački Petrovac, 1799

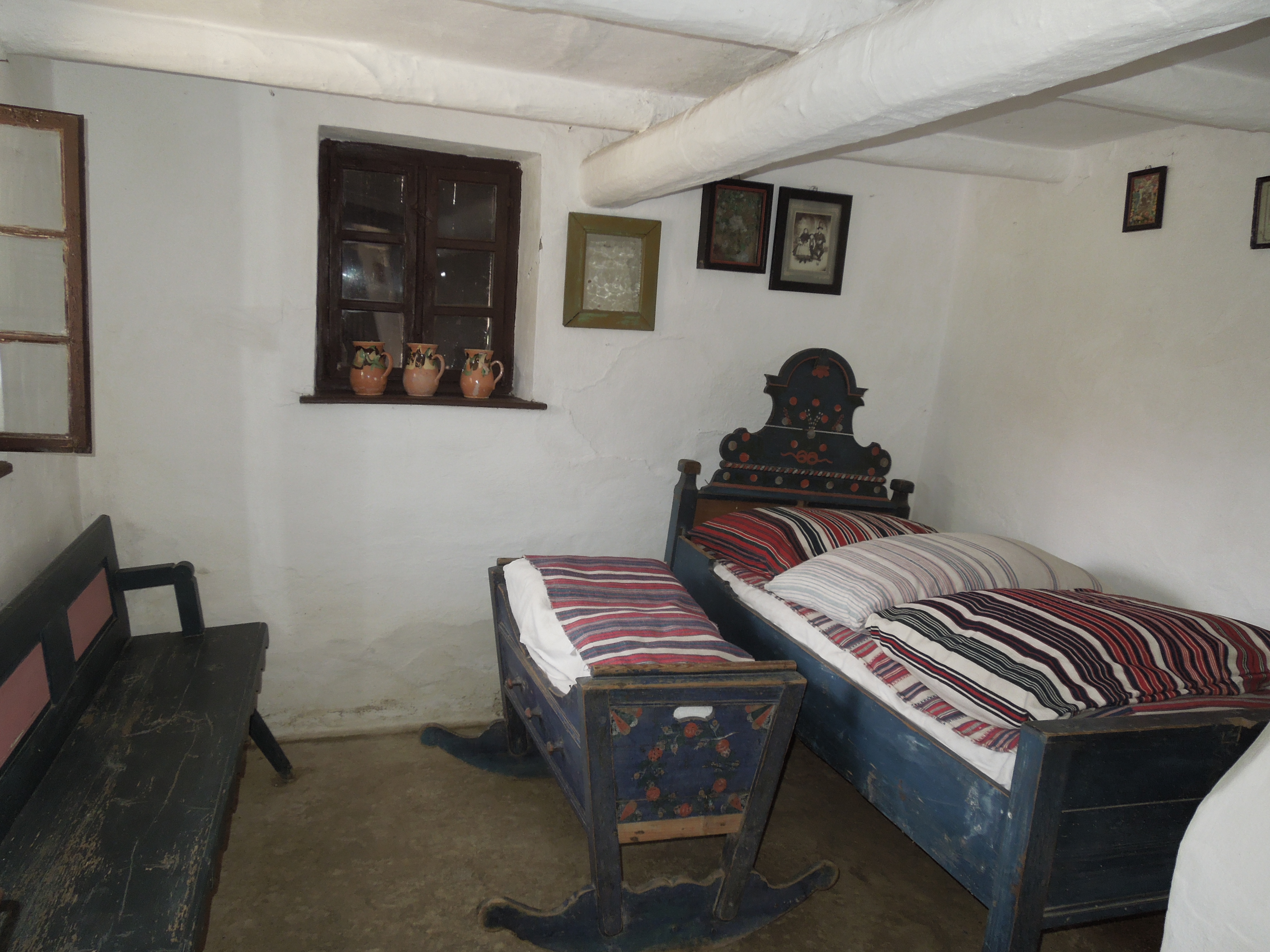
Salaš interior in Bački Petrovac

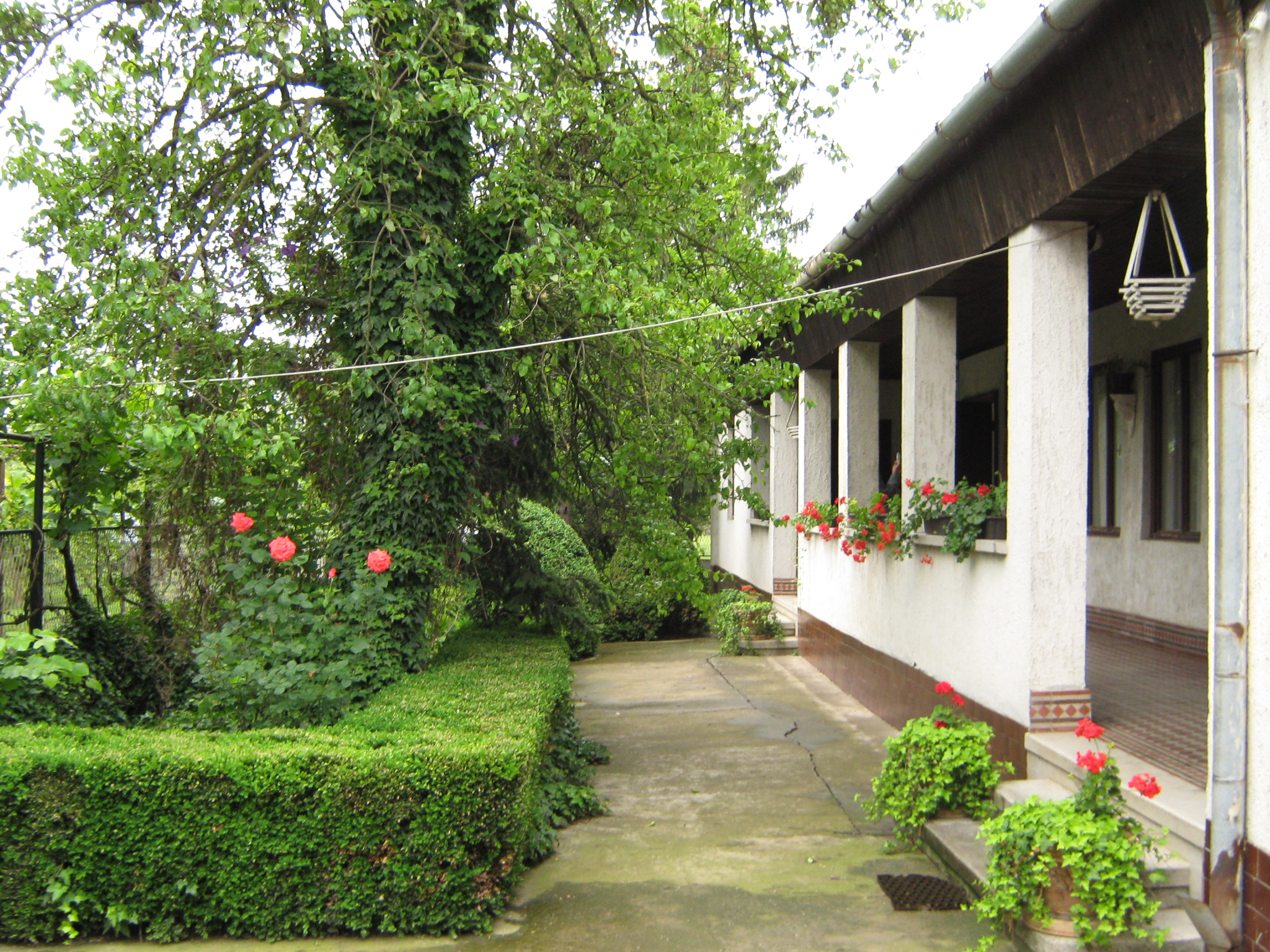
Dida Hornjakov salaš near Sombor, 1901

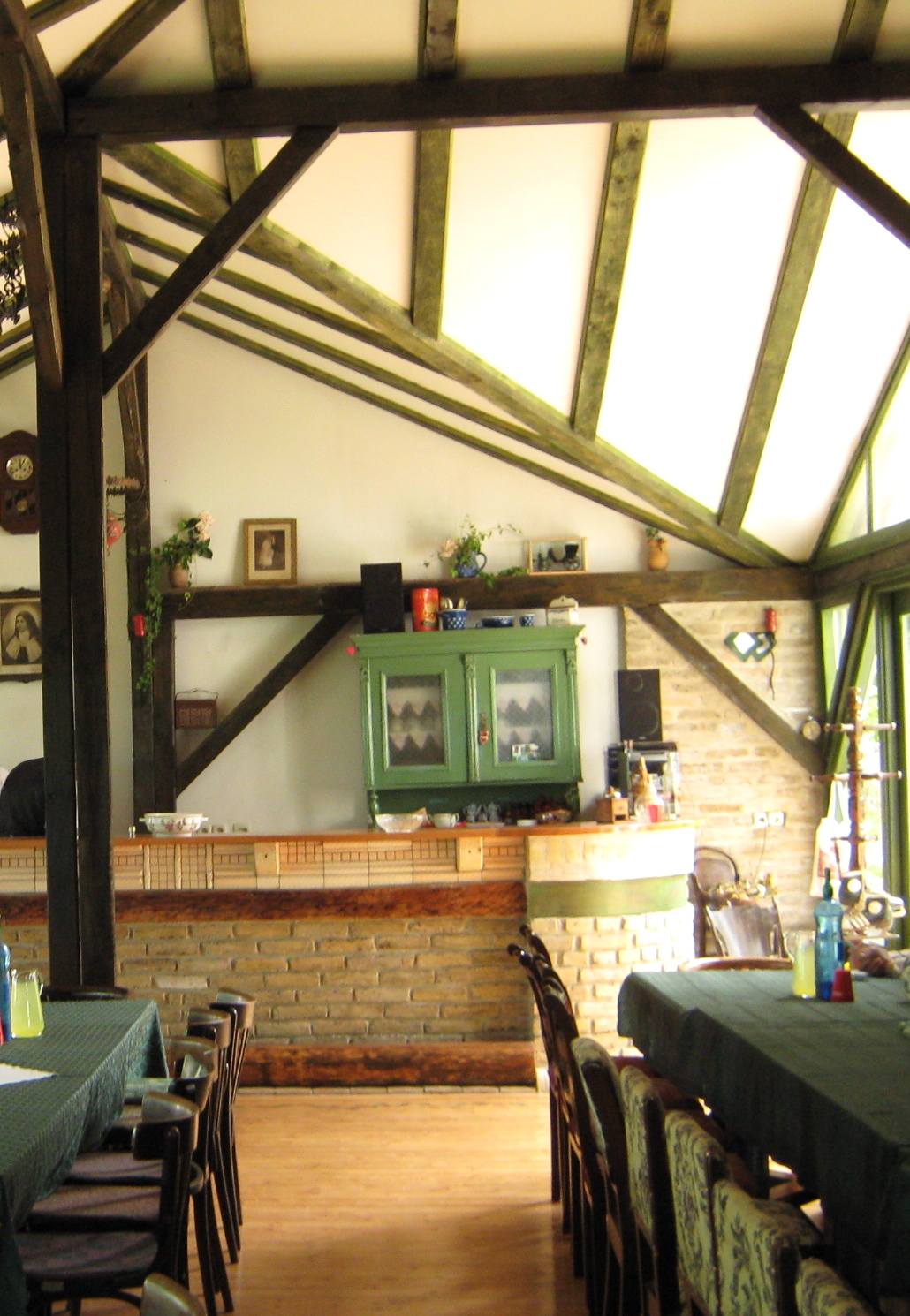
Interior of Dida Hornjakov salaš

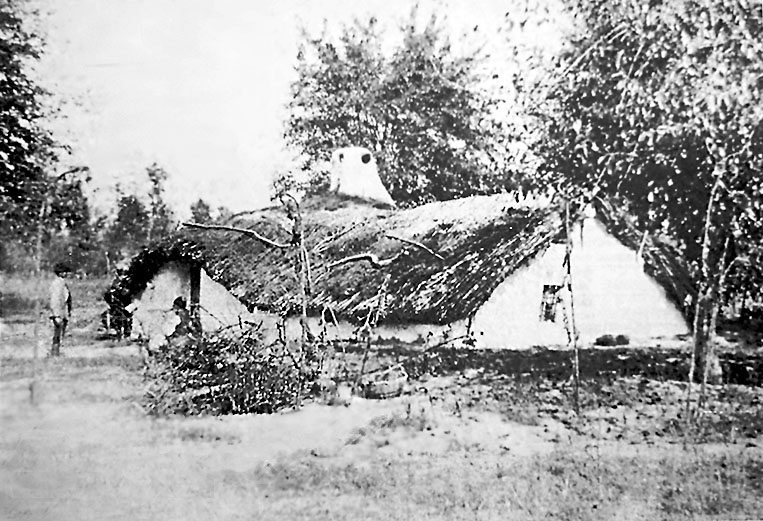
Ground level shack around Subotica, 1909

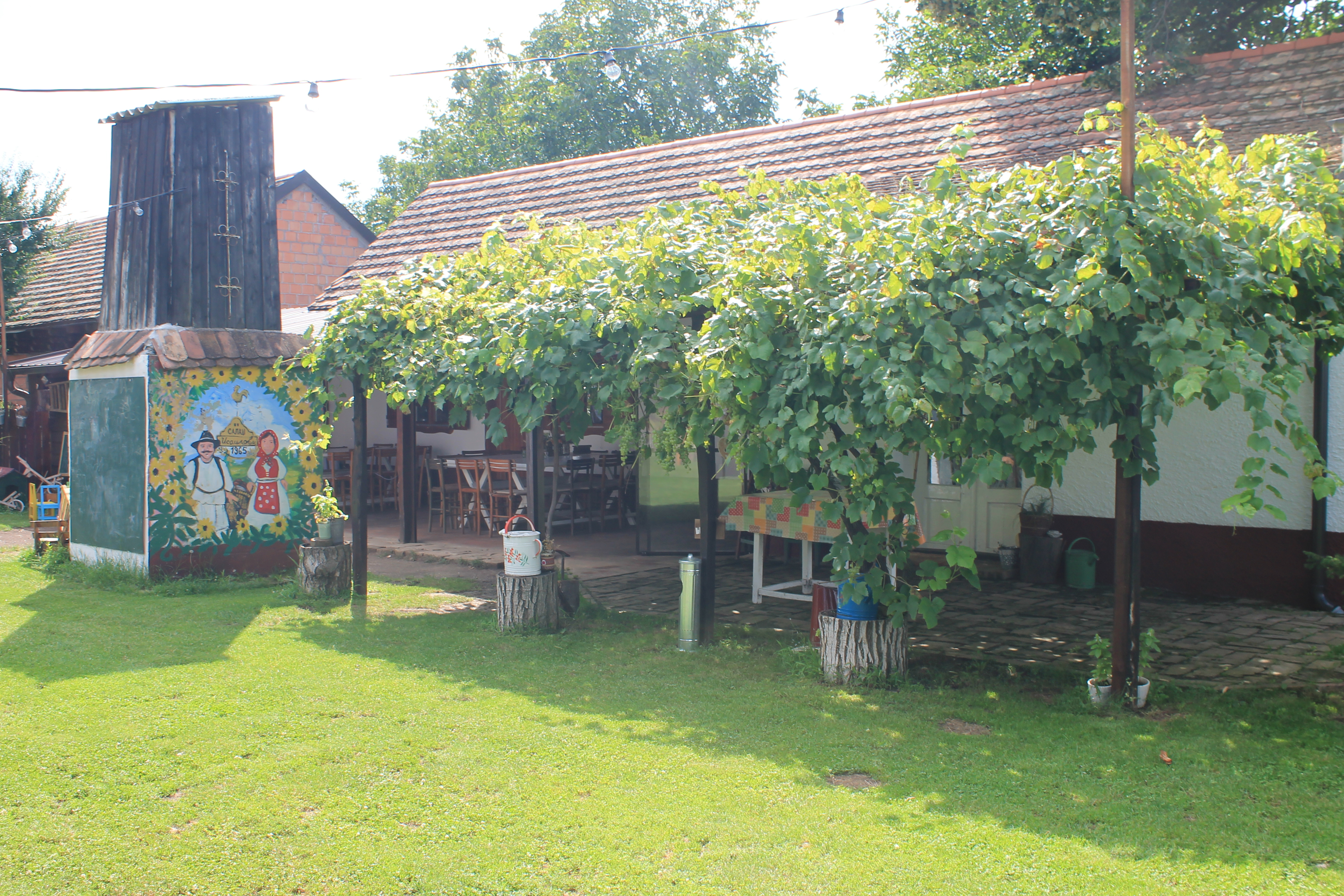
Isailovi salaš between Ruma and Sremska Mitrovica, 1965

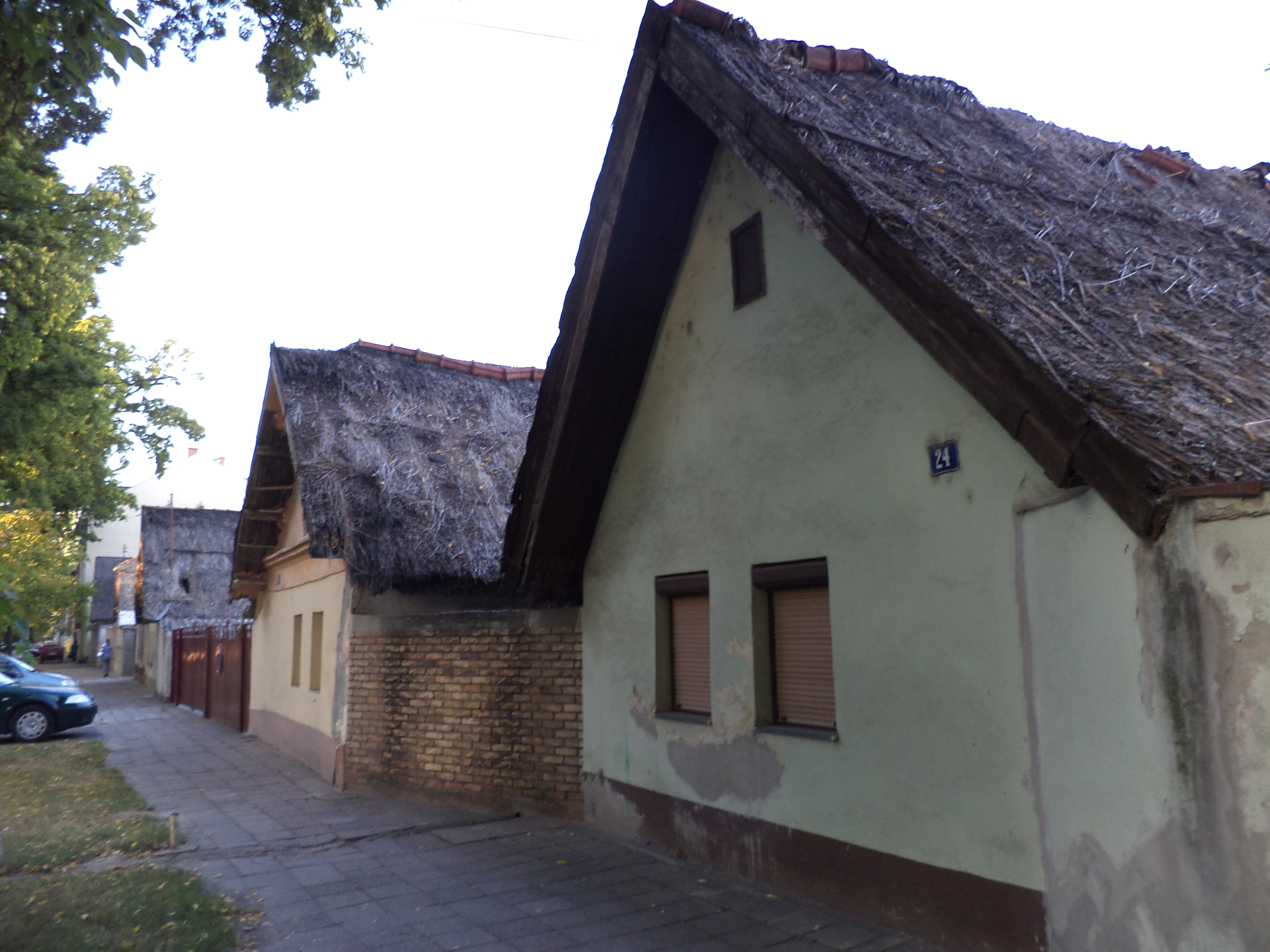
Trščare in Novi Sad, prior to 2016 demolition

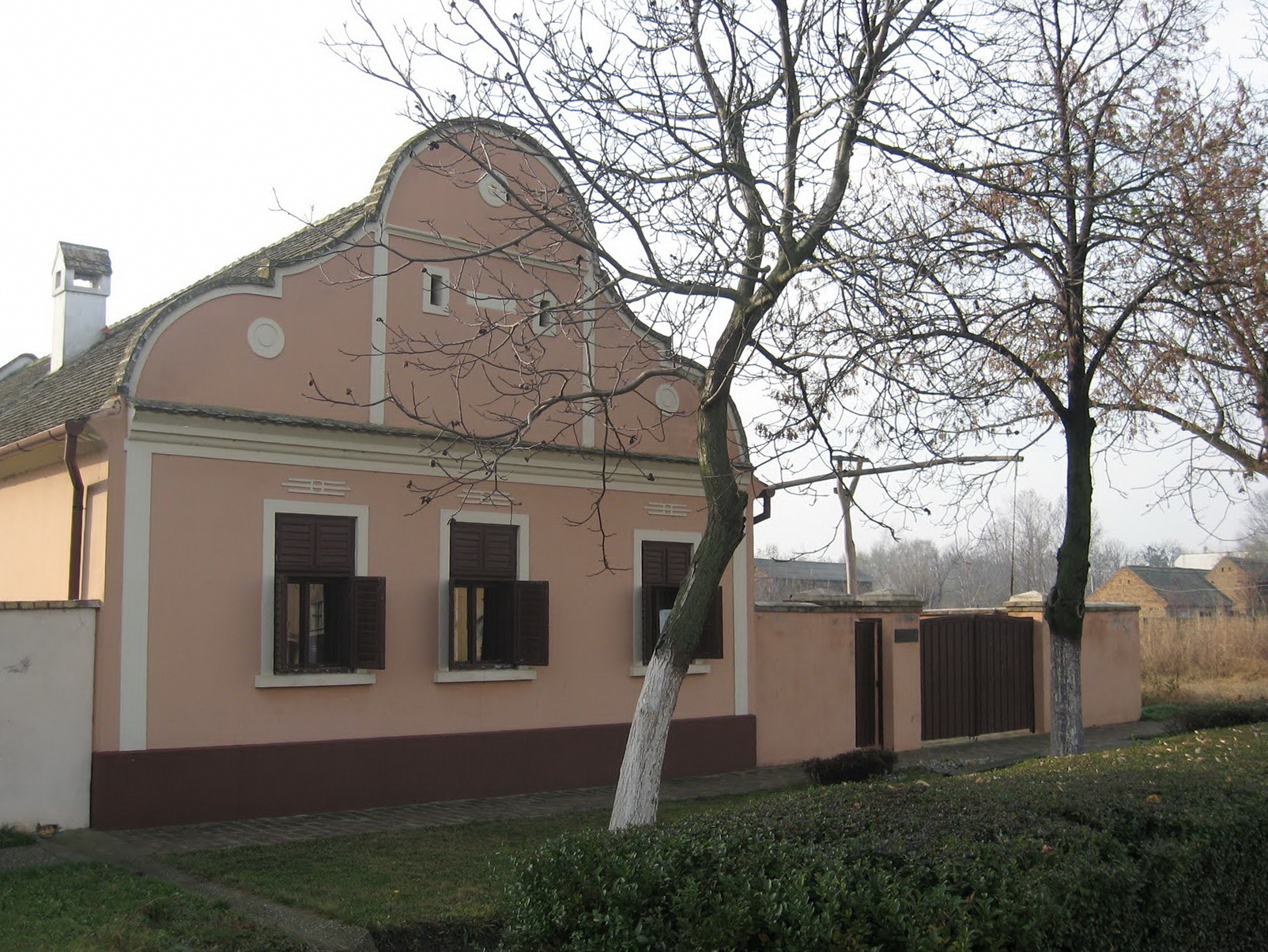
Family House of Mihajlo Pupin in Idvor, typical example of Pannonian styled house

=== Baroque and Rococo ===
During the short-lived Austrian rule over Belgrade, a Baroque quarter was built, with a square and several monumental buildings. After the reconquest of city by Ottoman Turks, all Baroque buildings were demolished.

Most Serbian Orthodox churches were built with all the characteristics of Baroque churches built in the Austrian and Hungarian administered regions. The churches usually had a bell tower (some with two or three bell towers), and a single nave building with the iconostasis inside the church covered with Renaissance-style paintings. Most baroque churches would include elements of neo-classical architecture, contributing to a more eclectic design. These churches can mostly be found in Vojvodina province. Monasteries of Fruška Gora are exceptional, with Krušedol, Grgeteg, Jazak, Velika Remeta and others being the best examples of Orthodox church architecture in the baroque style. Modern Orthodox religious architecture in Vojvodina would rarely recreate baroque styles, often opting for Serbo-Byzantine Revival style instead. There are also examples of Catholic and Protestant churches in this style, though communities from these Christian denominations would often opt in designing churches in different revival styles, such as neo-gothic and neo-romanesque.

Non-religious baroque architecture is prevalent in areas around or north the Danube, mostly in areas of modern Vojvodina province that were under the Habsburg Empire. Bastion forts of Belgrade, Niš, Petrovaradin, Pančevo and Sremska Rača were built during these periods, often with baroque styled buildings. Petrovaradin Fortress and it's Old town is the best preserved settlement and fortification in Serbia with baroque styled architecture.

Novi Sad had a wider mix of architecture before the Hungarian Revolution of 1848. Most of the city was razed to the ground (2004 buildings out of 2812 were destroyed) by Hungarian revolutionaries bombarding it from Petrovaradin Fortress. After that period, the architectural legacy of Novi Sad would mostly be preserved in baroque styled architecture and subsequent historic revival styles. However, most of the baroque styled buildings, besides those in the city center, would have less richer architectural significance compared to the ones preserved in Petrovaradin.

Sremski Karlovci, besides Petrovaradin, is one of the best preserved settlements with baroque styled architecture in Serbia, which was a religious and political center of all Serbs in the Habsburg Empire. The settlement also has one of the rare examples of Rococo in Serbia, with Sabov-Dejanović's House (one of the oldest preserved buildings in Sremski Karlovci).

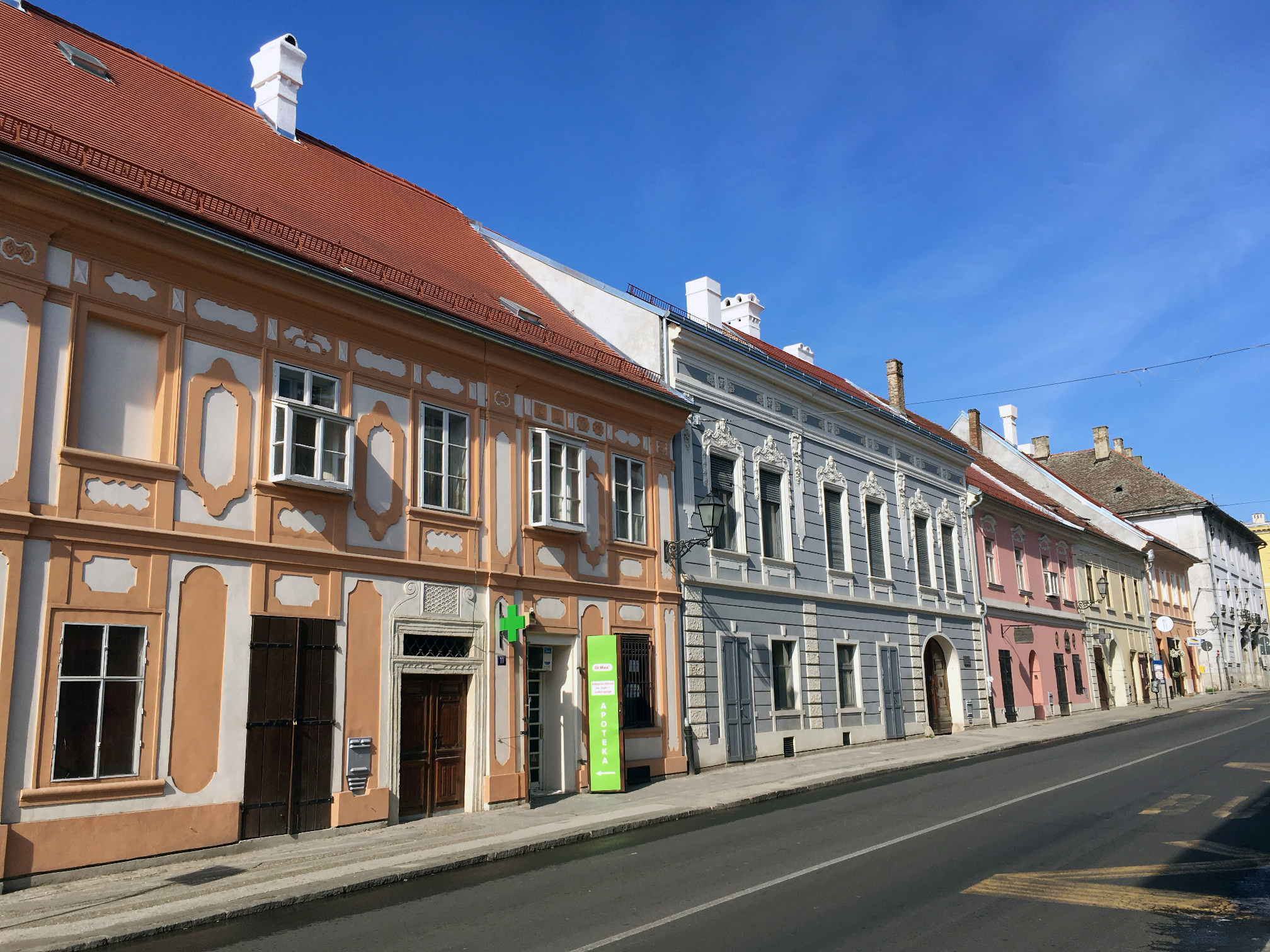
Most buildings in the old part of Petrovaradin in Novi Sad are in the baroque style

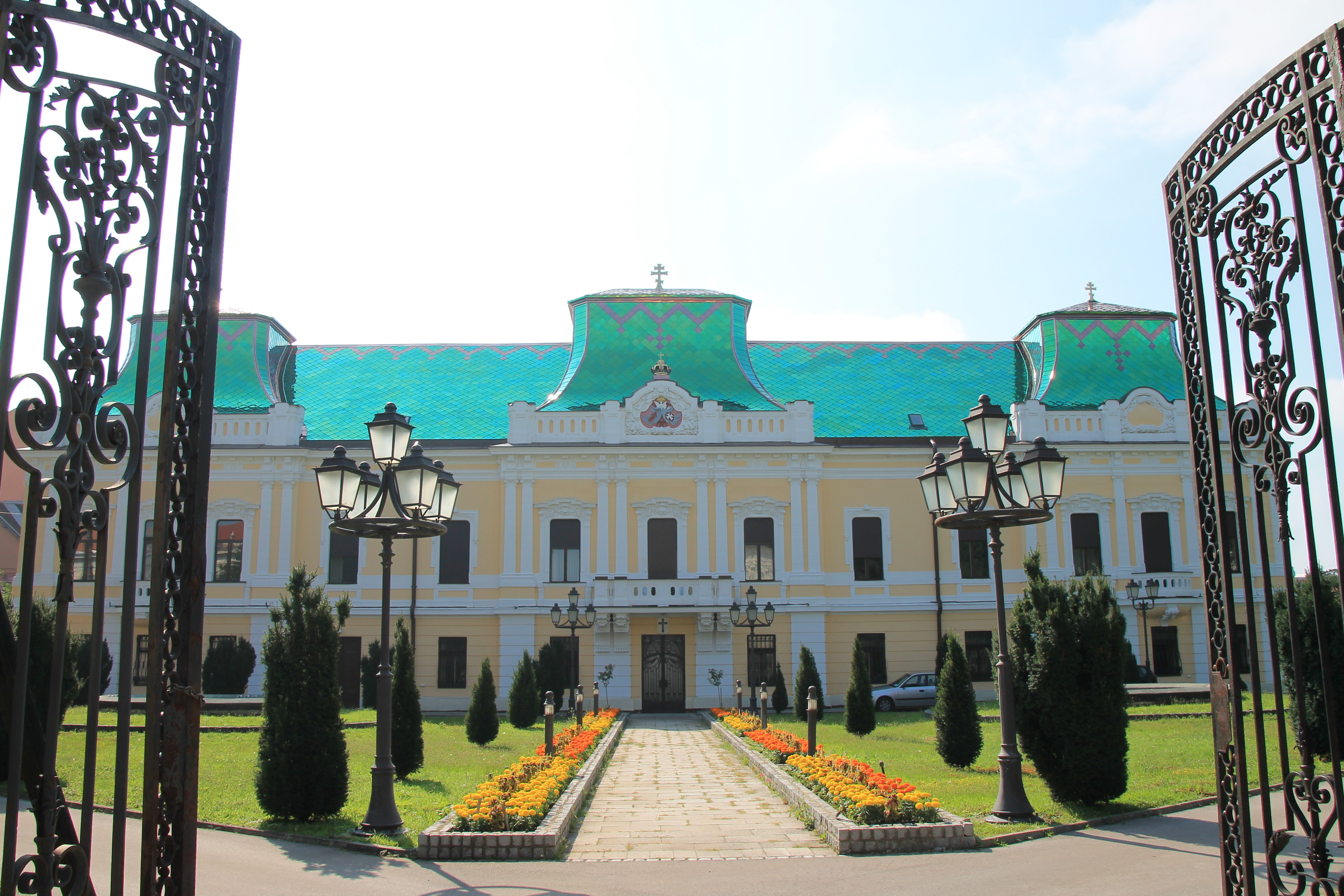
Bishop's Palace in Vršac, 1757

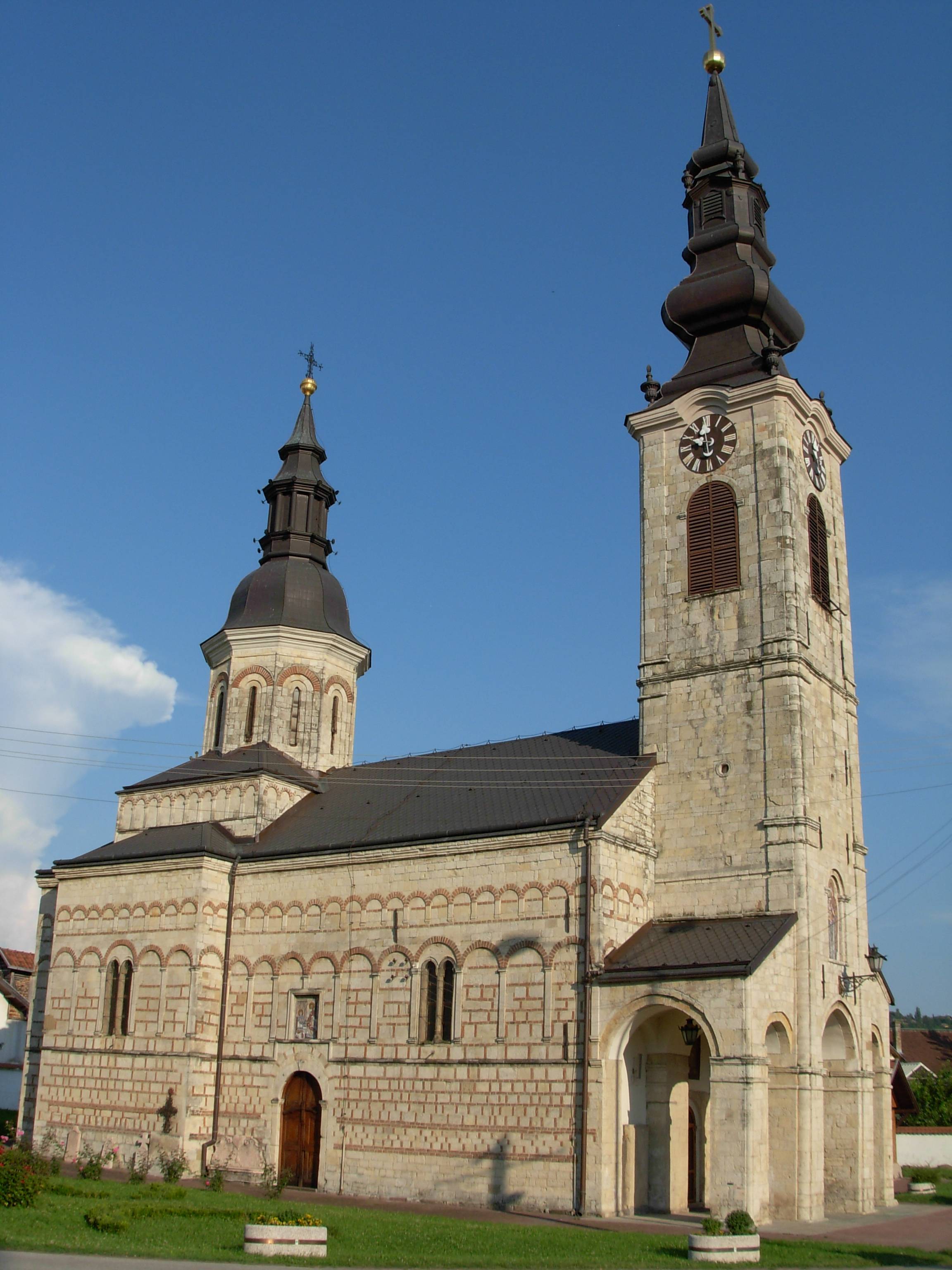
Orthodox Church of the Nativity of the Theotokos in Sremska Kamenica, Novi Sad, 1758

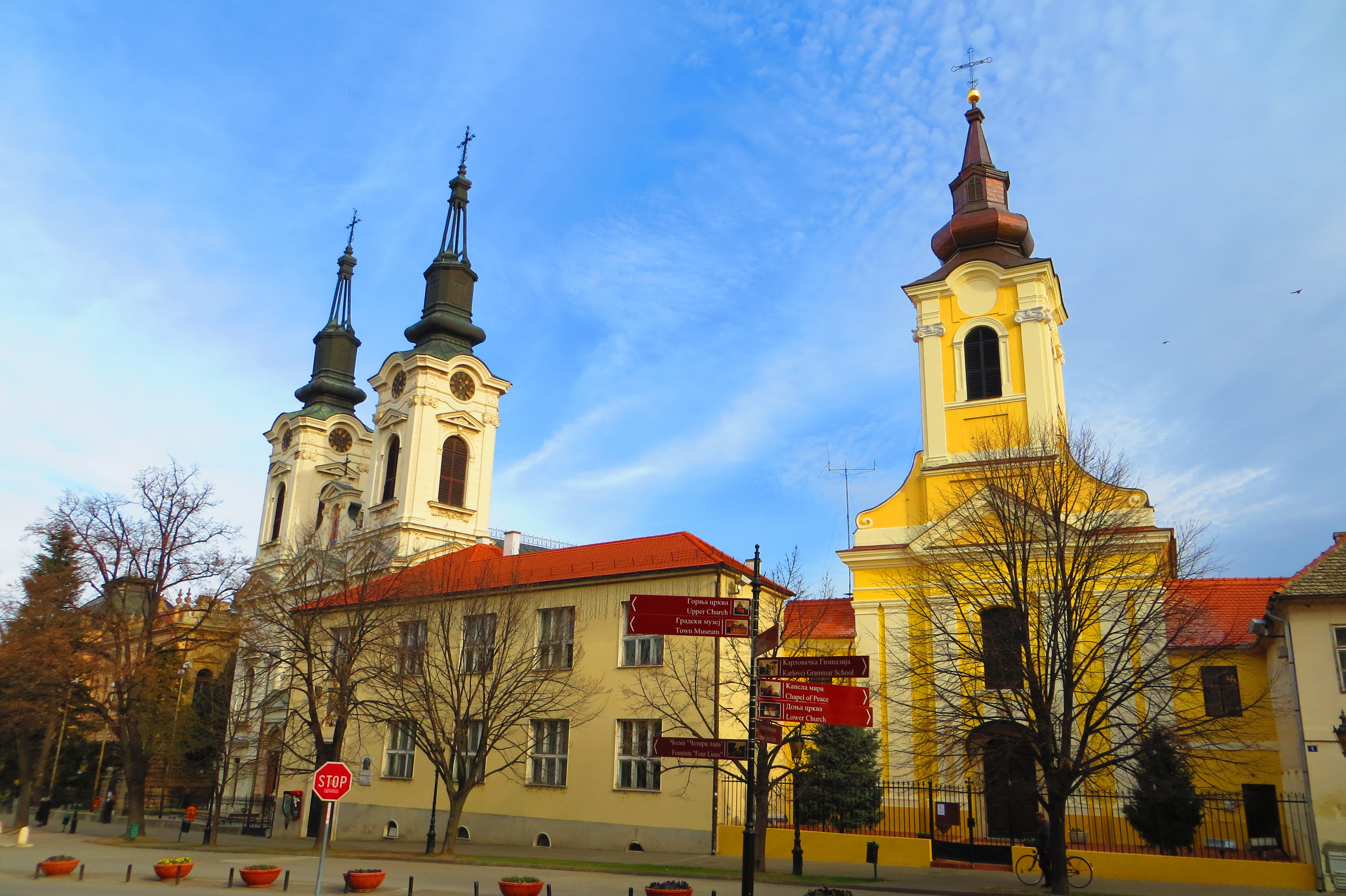
Orthodox Cathedral of St. Nicholas (1758) and Catholic Church of the Holy Trinity (1768) in Sremski Karlovci

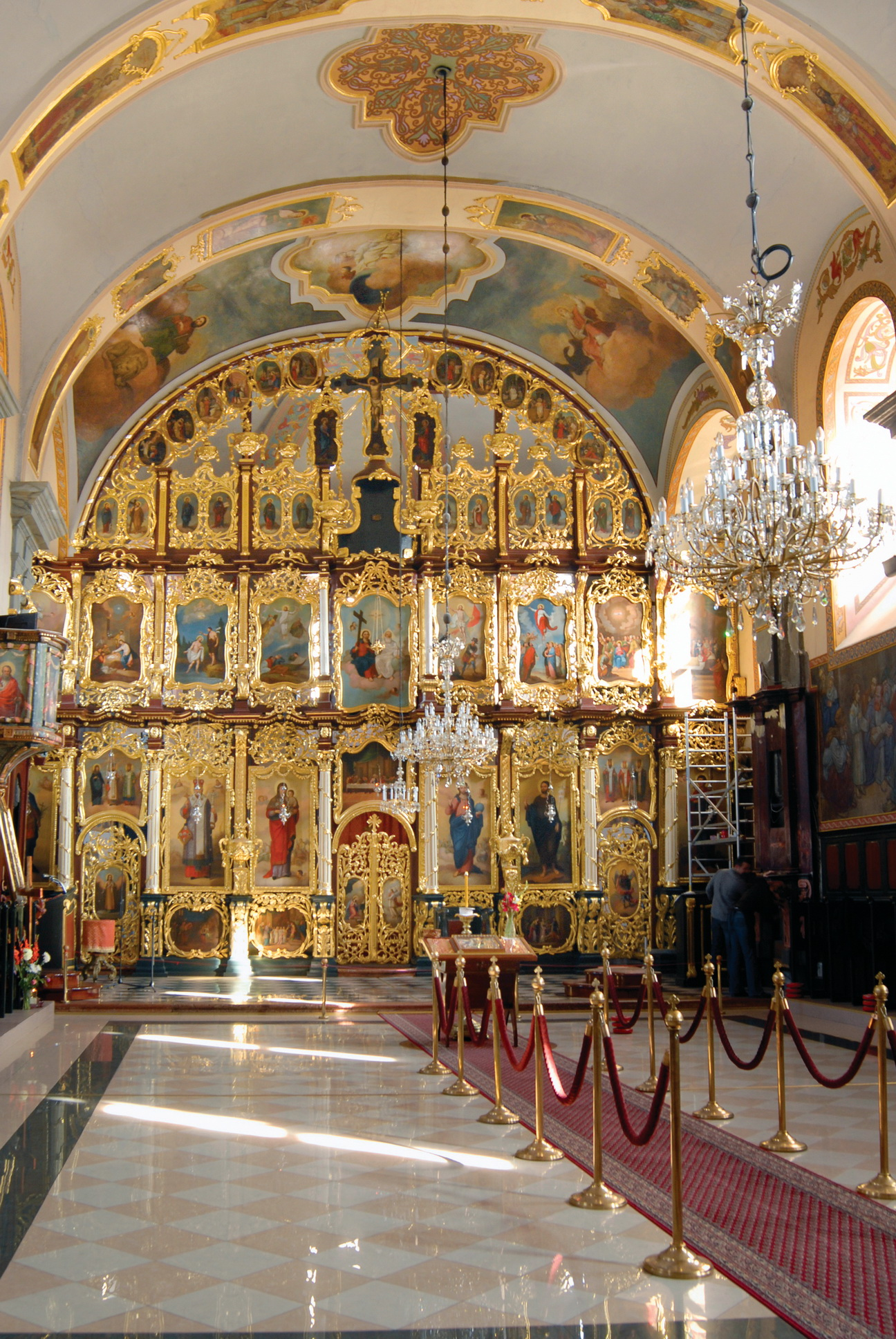
Interior of the Orthodox Church of the Holy Virgin in Zemun, 1774

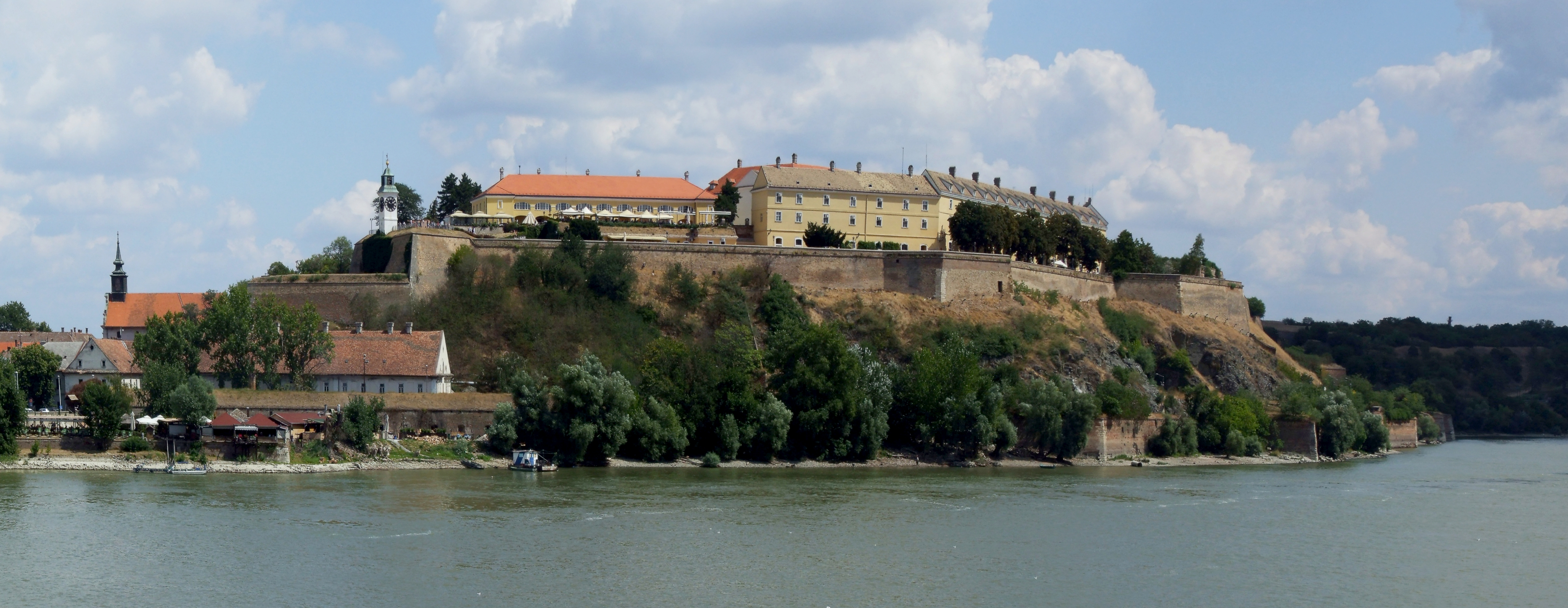
Petrovaradin Fortress by Mathias Keyserfeld, Luigi Ferdinando Marsigli, Sébastien Le Prestre de Vauban and Michael Wambergin in Novi Sad, 1780

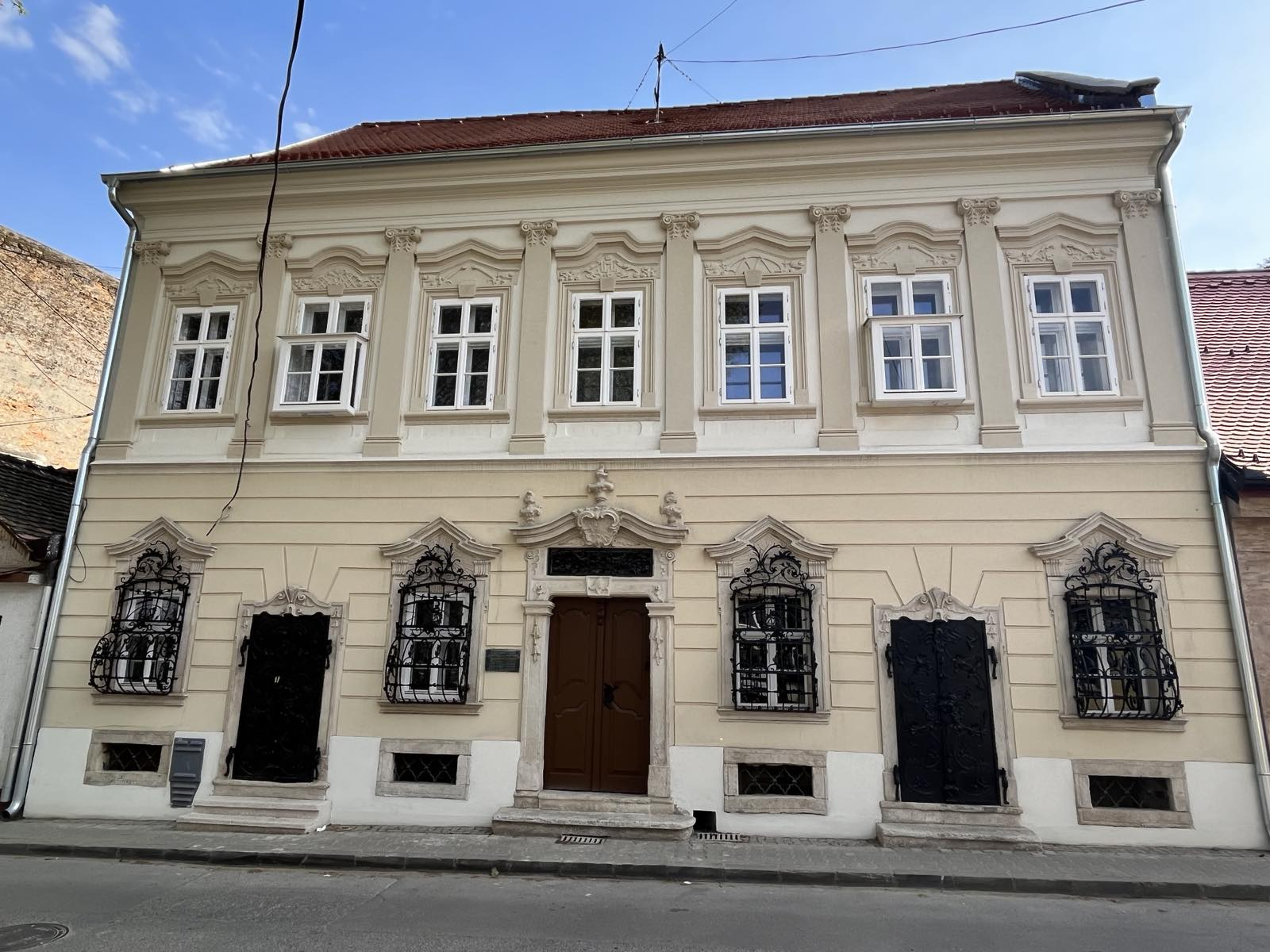
Sabov-Dejanović's Rococo House in Sremski Karlovci, 1790

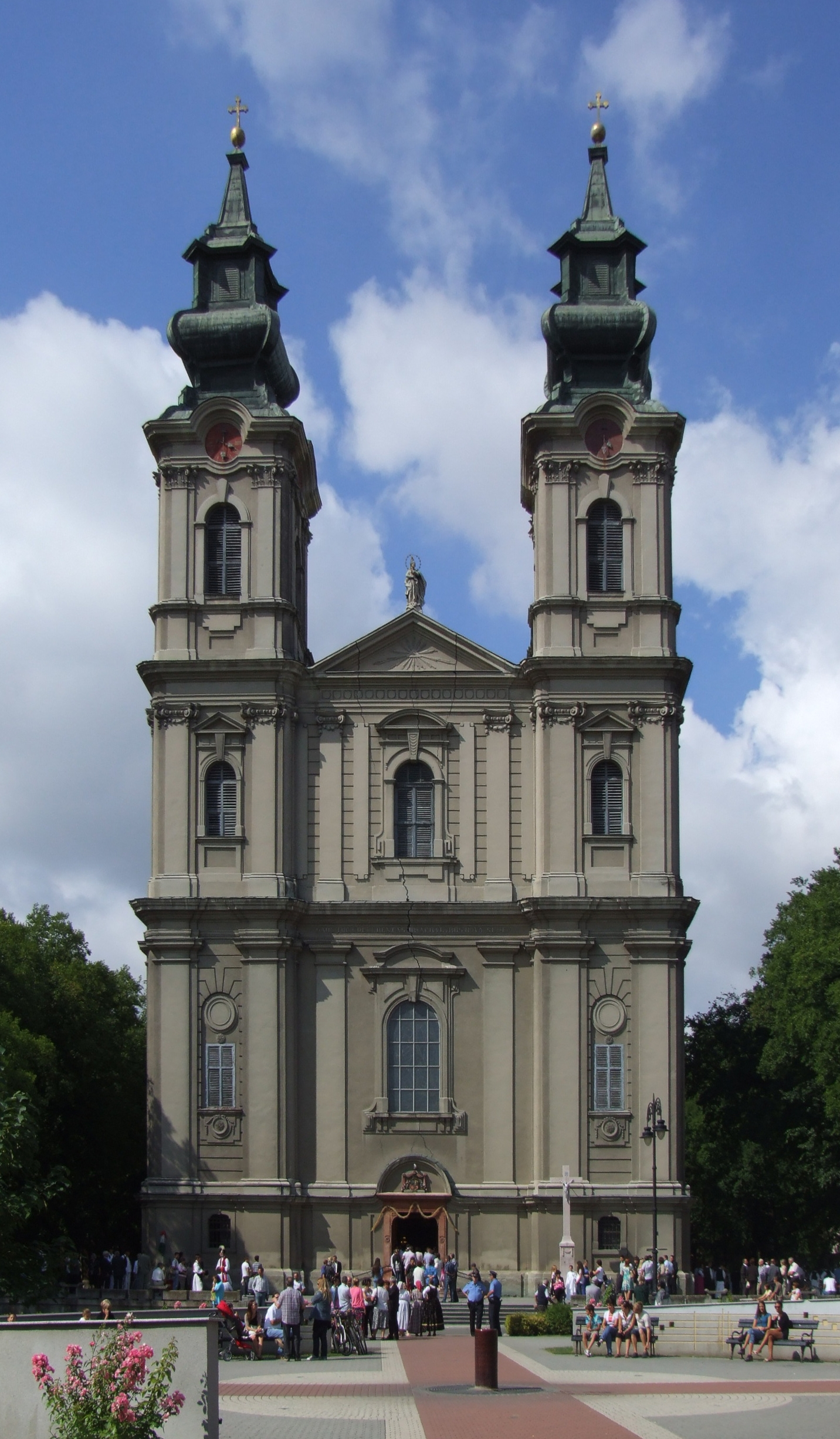
St. Theresa of Avila Catholic Cathedral in Subotica, 1797

=== Historic Styles ===
==== Gothic Revival ====
Neo-gothic architecture is mostly relegated to Vojvodina province, usually used for Catholic, Protestant, and Franciscan churches such as the Monastery of St. Michael (1729), the Church of St. Roch (1896) in Subotica, and the Church of the Heart of Jesus (1908) in Futog, Novi Sad. Due to their height, neo-gothic churches are still among the tallest structures in Serbia.

There are some examples of manor and town houses incorporating the style such as the Spirta House (1855) in Zemun, Belgrade, built by Heinrich von Ferstel and Kapetanovo castle (1906) in Stari Lec.

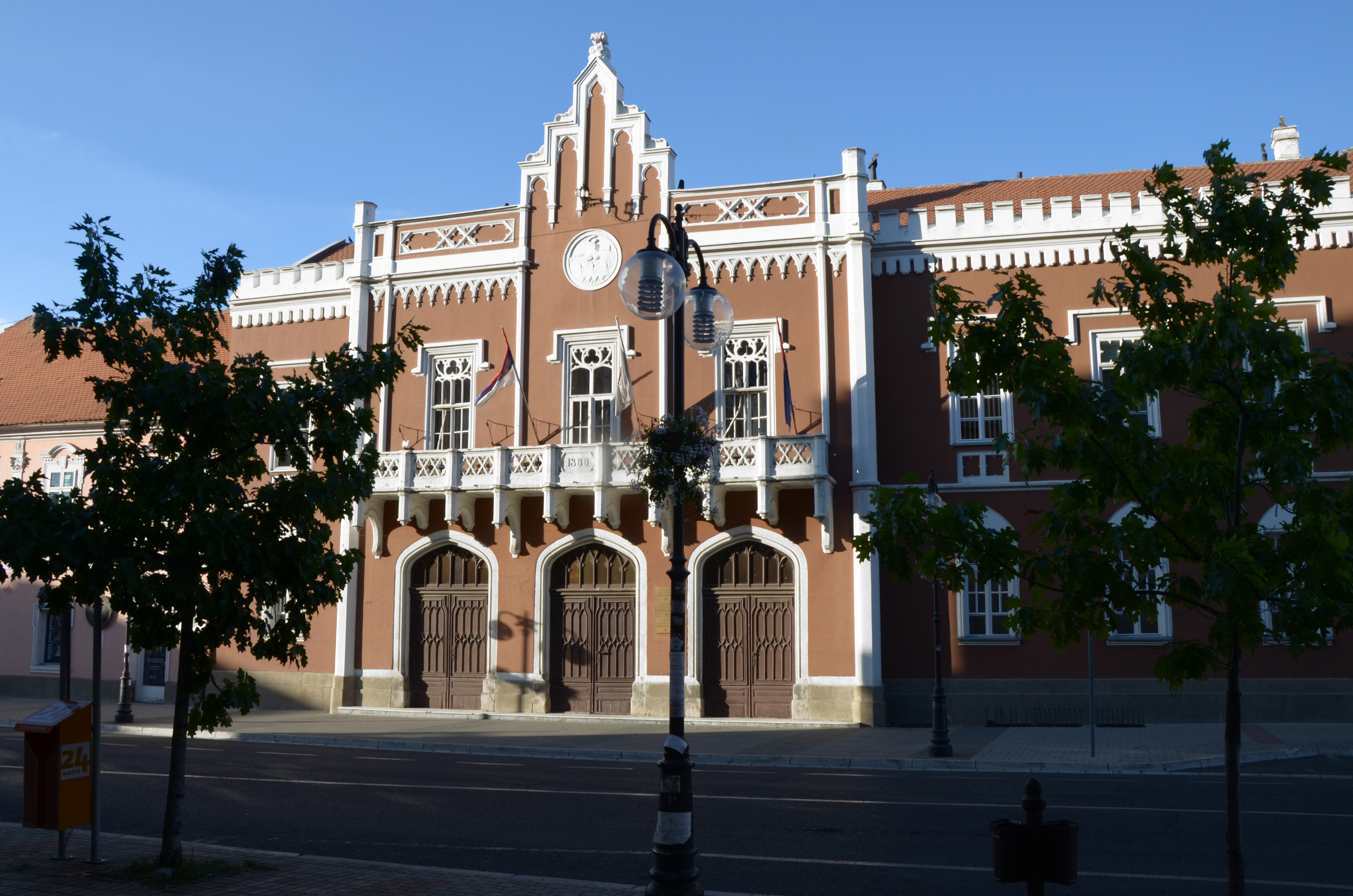
Vršac City Hall by Sigismund Kiler, Franc Brandaj, C.K. Merni and Wilhelm Biher, 1860

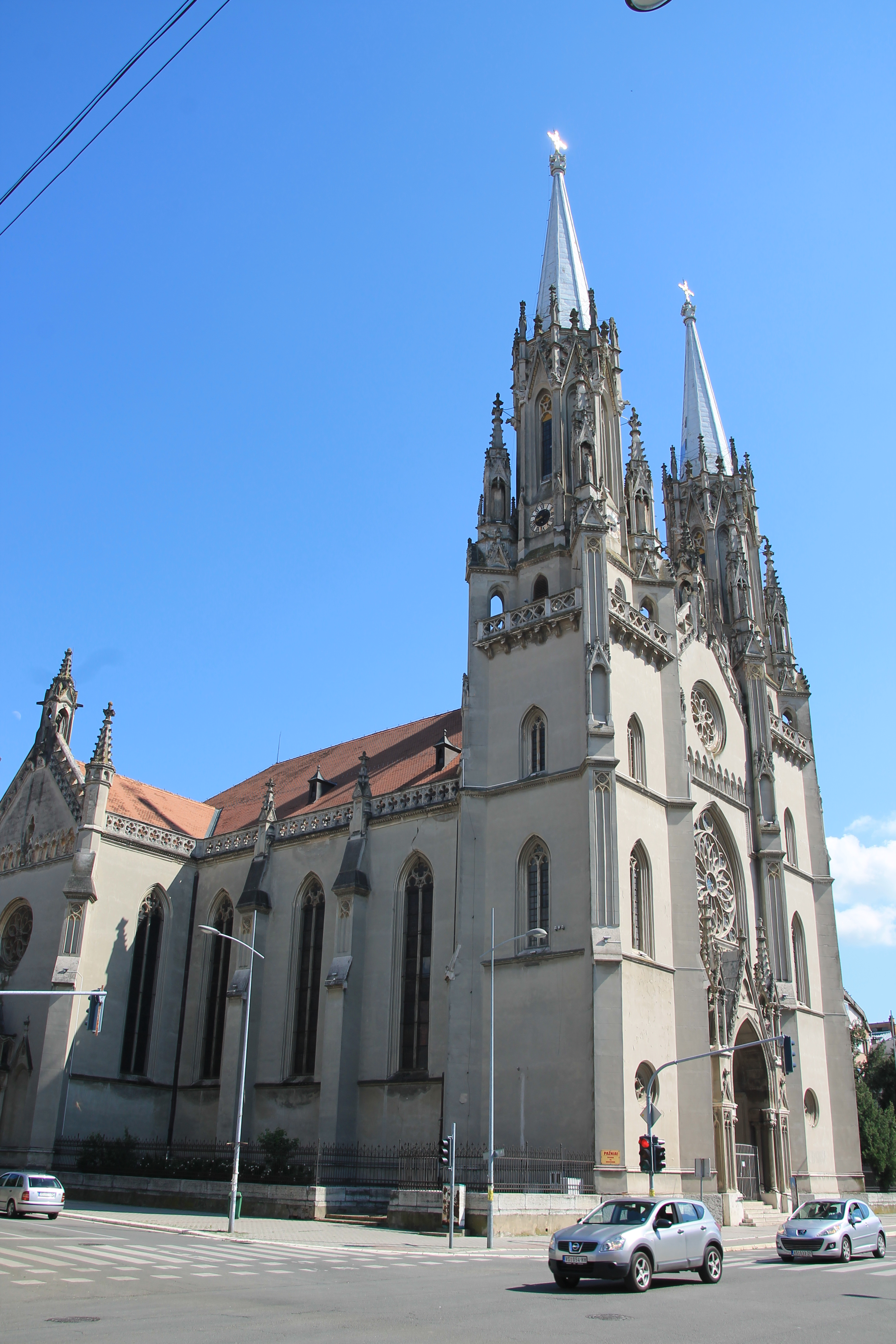
Catholic Church of St. Gerard the Bishop and Martyr by Franz Brandeissin in Vršac, 1863

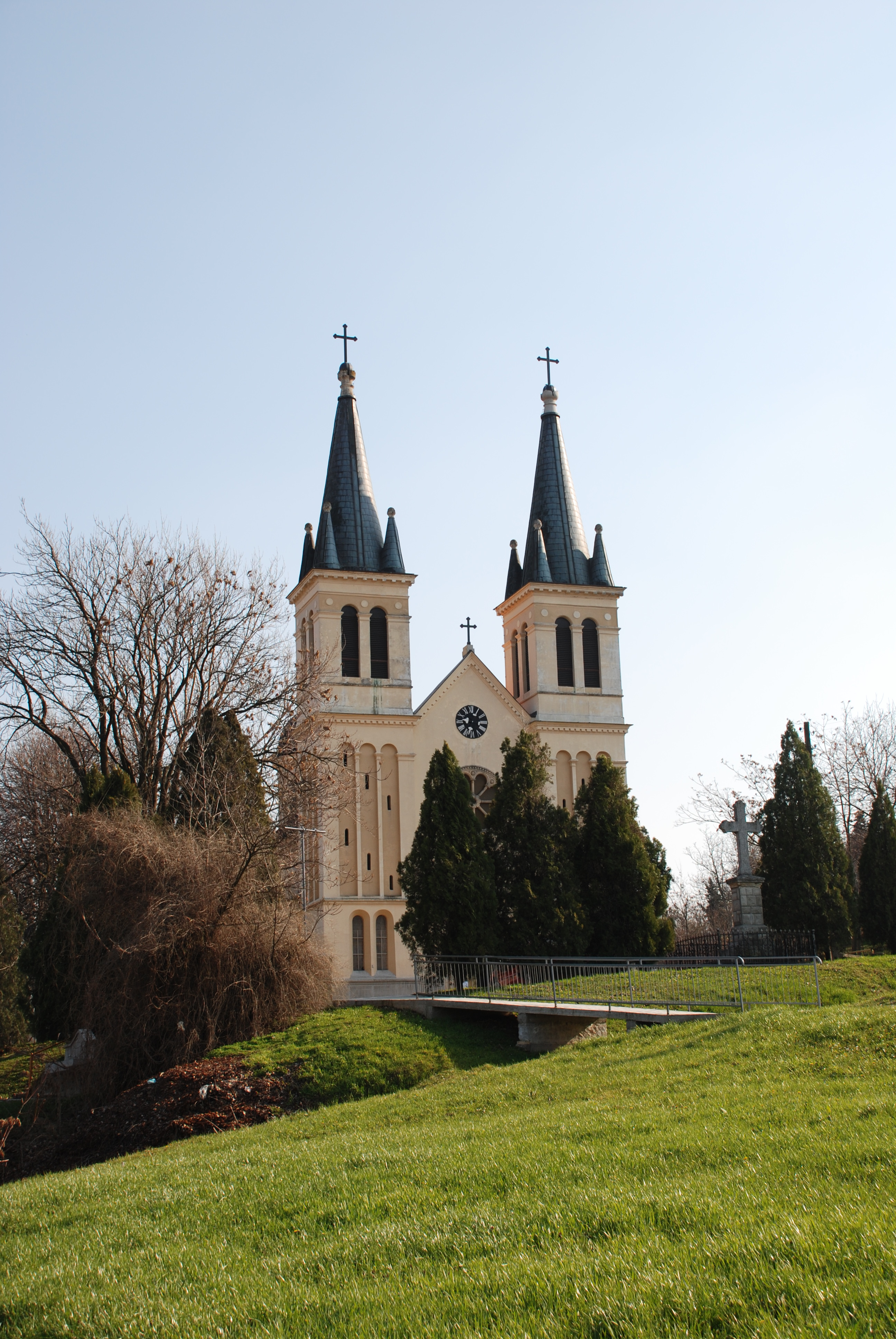
The Our Lady of Snow Ecumenic Church by Hermann Bollé in Petrovaradin, Novi Sad, 1881

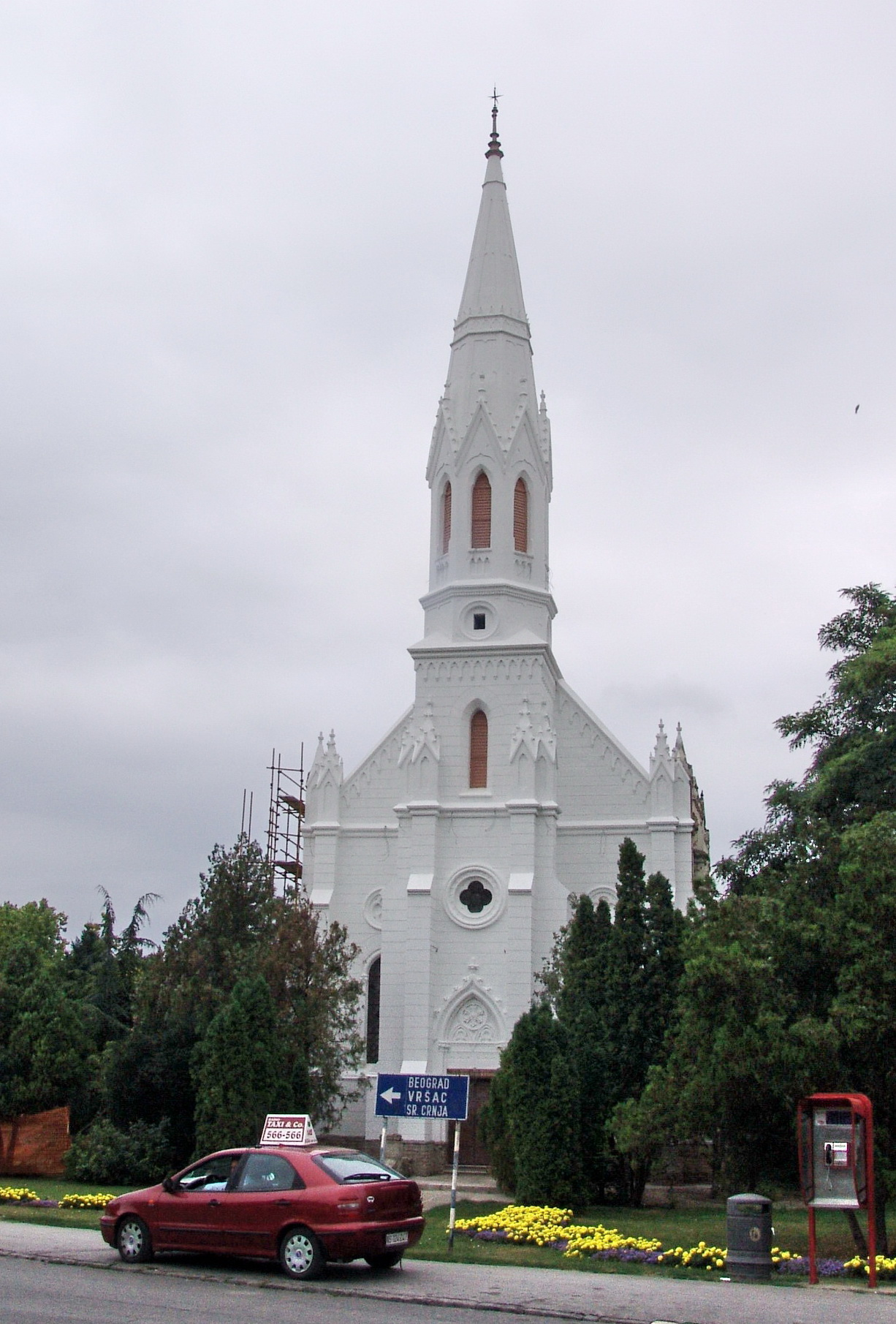
Reformation Church by Ferenca Zaboreckog in Zrenjanin, 1891

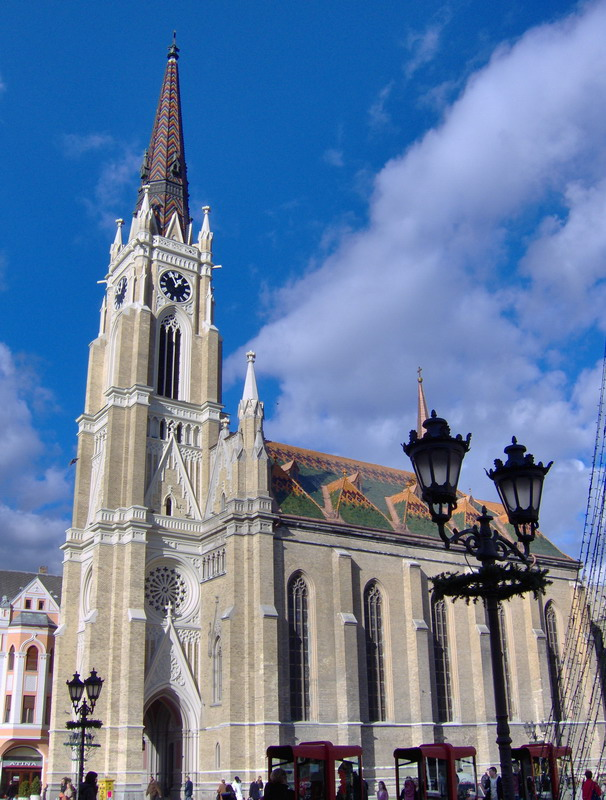
Catholic Name of Mary Church by György Molnár in Novi Sad, 1894

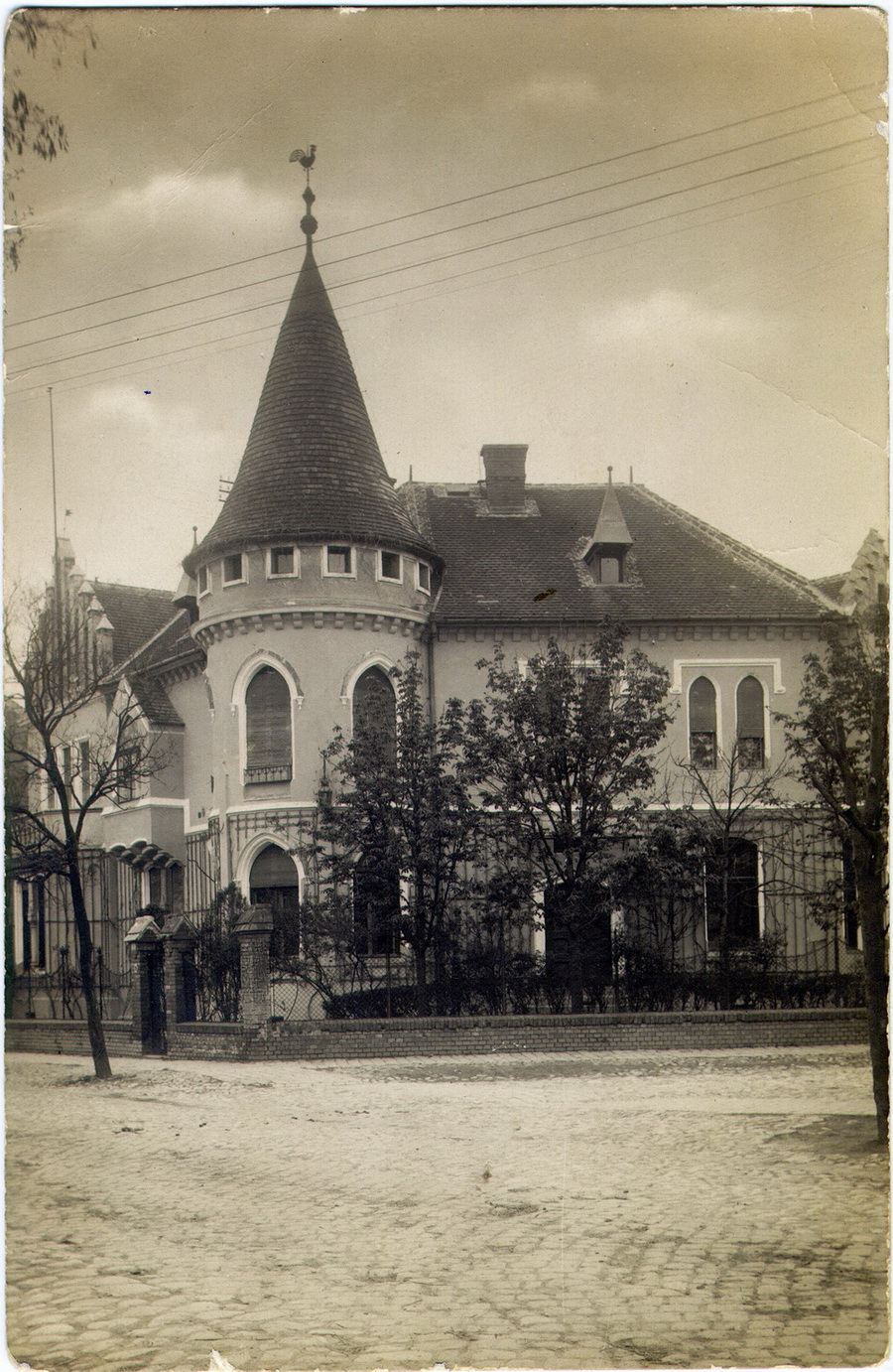
Pin's Villa in Zrenjanin by Laslo Đaluš, 1894

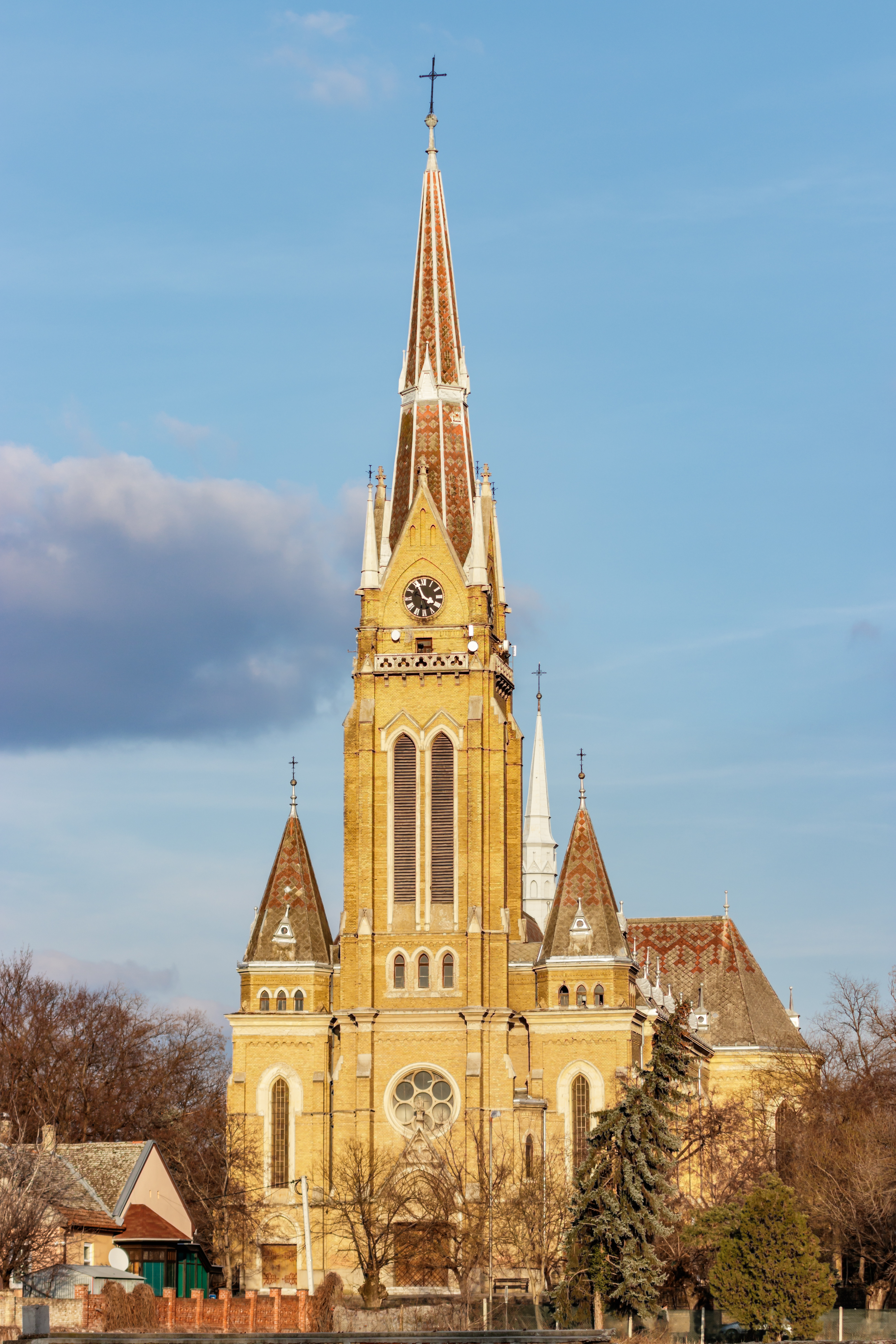
Catholic Church of St. Virgin Mary in Bačka Topola, 1906

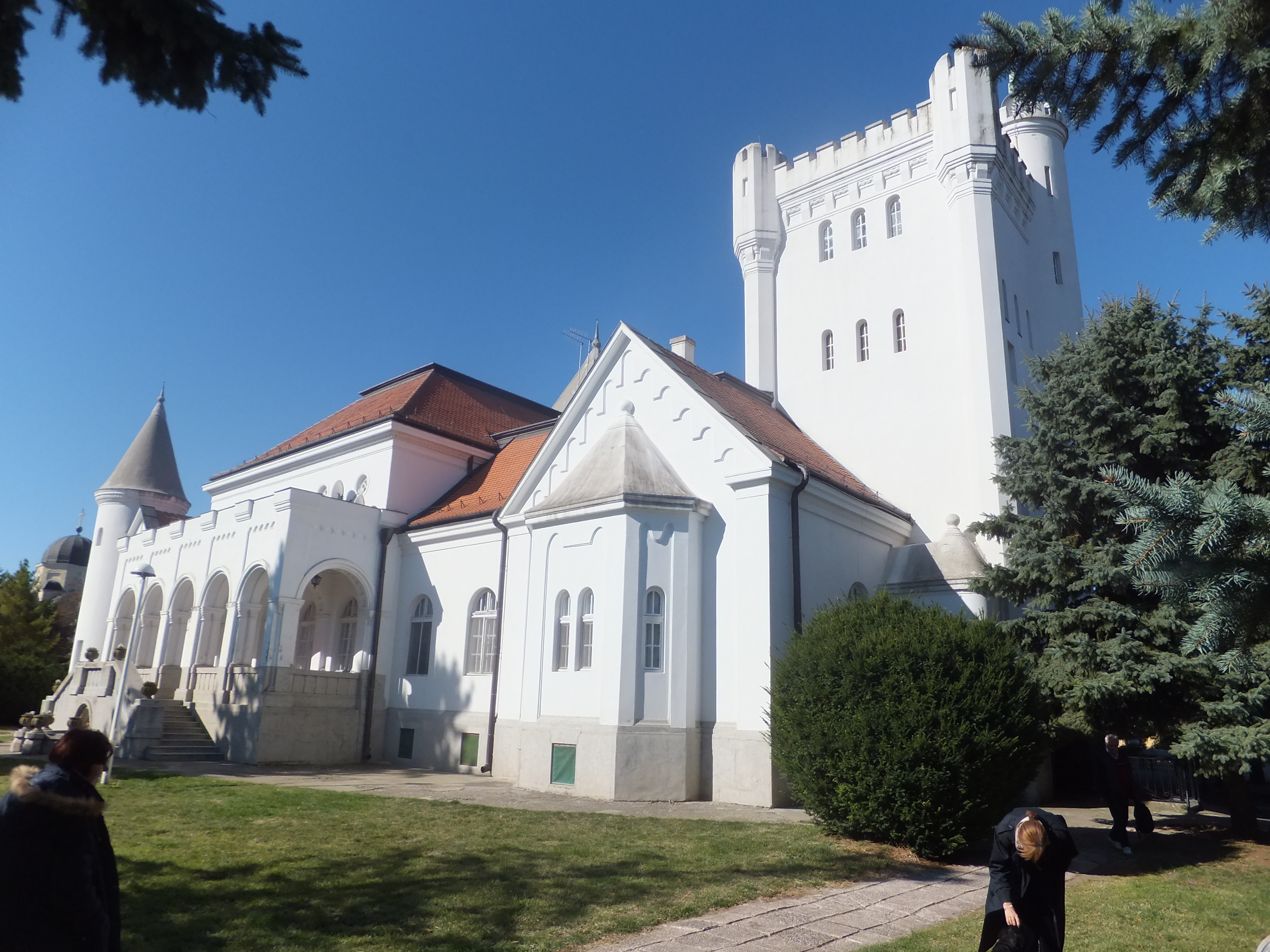
Fantast Castle in Bečej, 1925

==== Romanesque Revival ====
Romanesque Revival Style mostly relegated to Vojvodina province, specifically Catholic and Protestant areas. The neo-romanesque buildings in Vojvodina differ in design of romanesque churches in southern Serbia, due to taking more visual architectural motifs of Central European romanesque, with sharper spires and round front windows.

Hungarian Student Dorm "Europe" by Bela Migoi is an example of contemporary Romanesque Revival architecture. Inspired by the Catholic Church of St. Elizabeth by Mihajl Plavec right next to the dorm, the two structures complement each other in visual design despite nearly a century apart from each buildings construction.

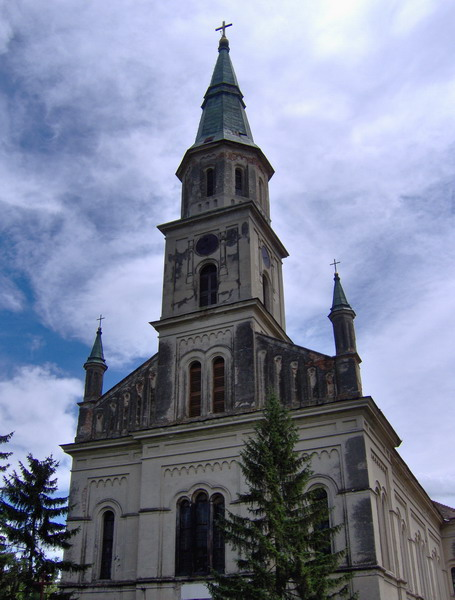
Catholic Church of St. John the Baptist in Ečka, 1864

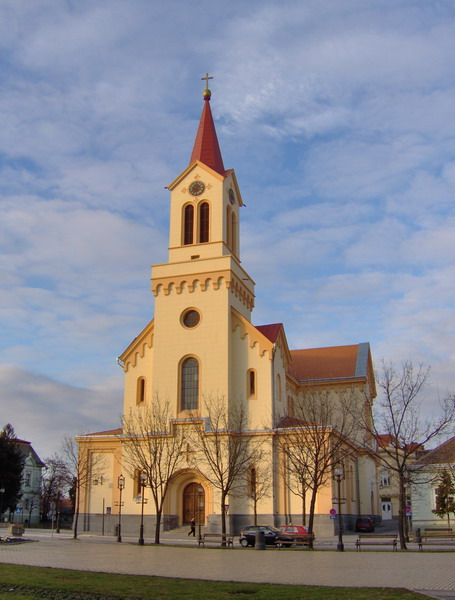
Catholic Cathedral of St. John of Nepomuk by László Német in Zrenjanin, 1867

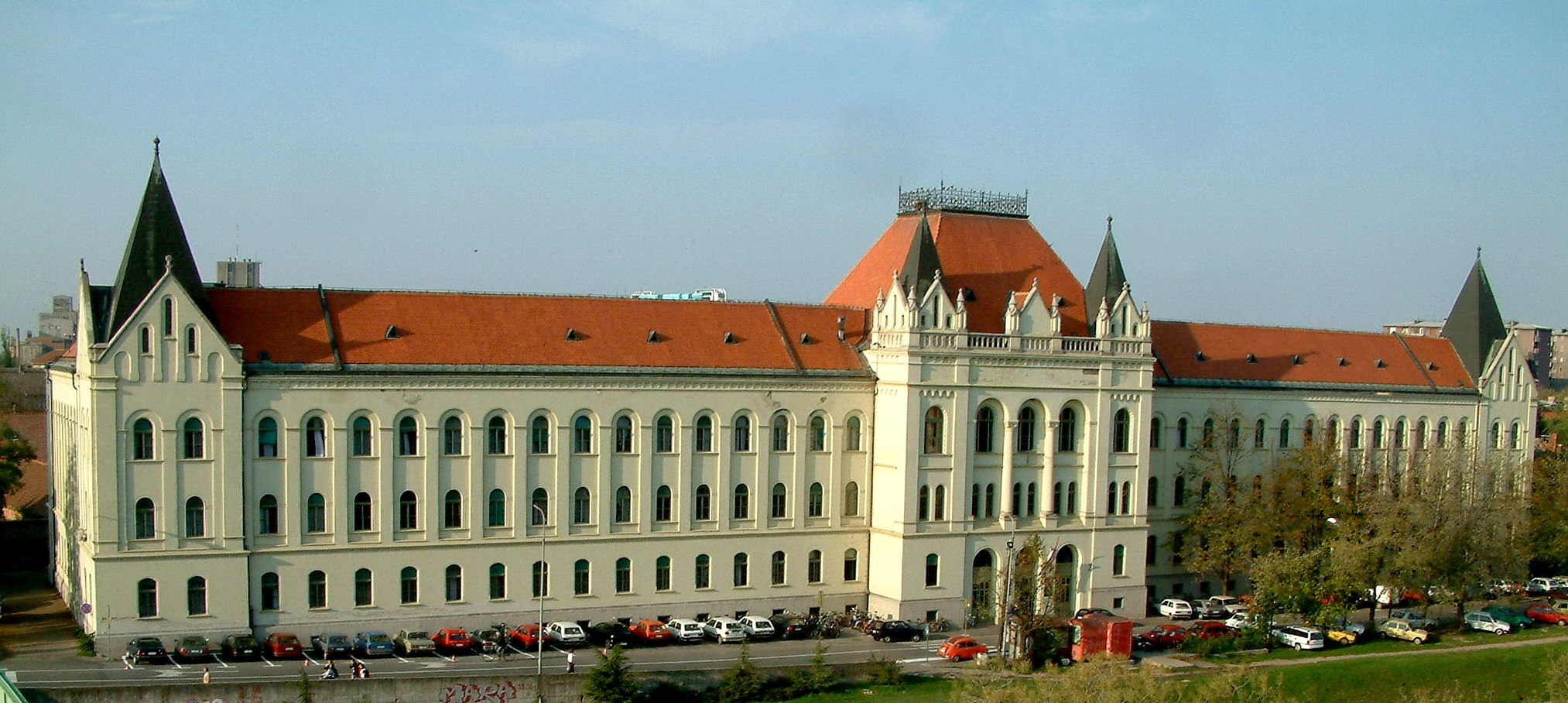
Court House by Sándor Eigner in Zrenjanin, 1908

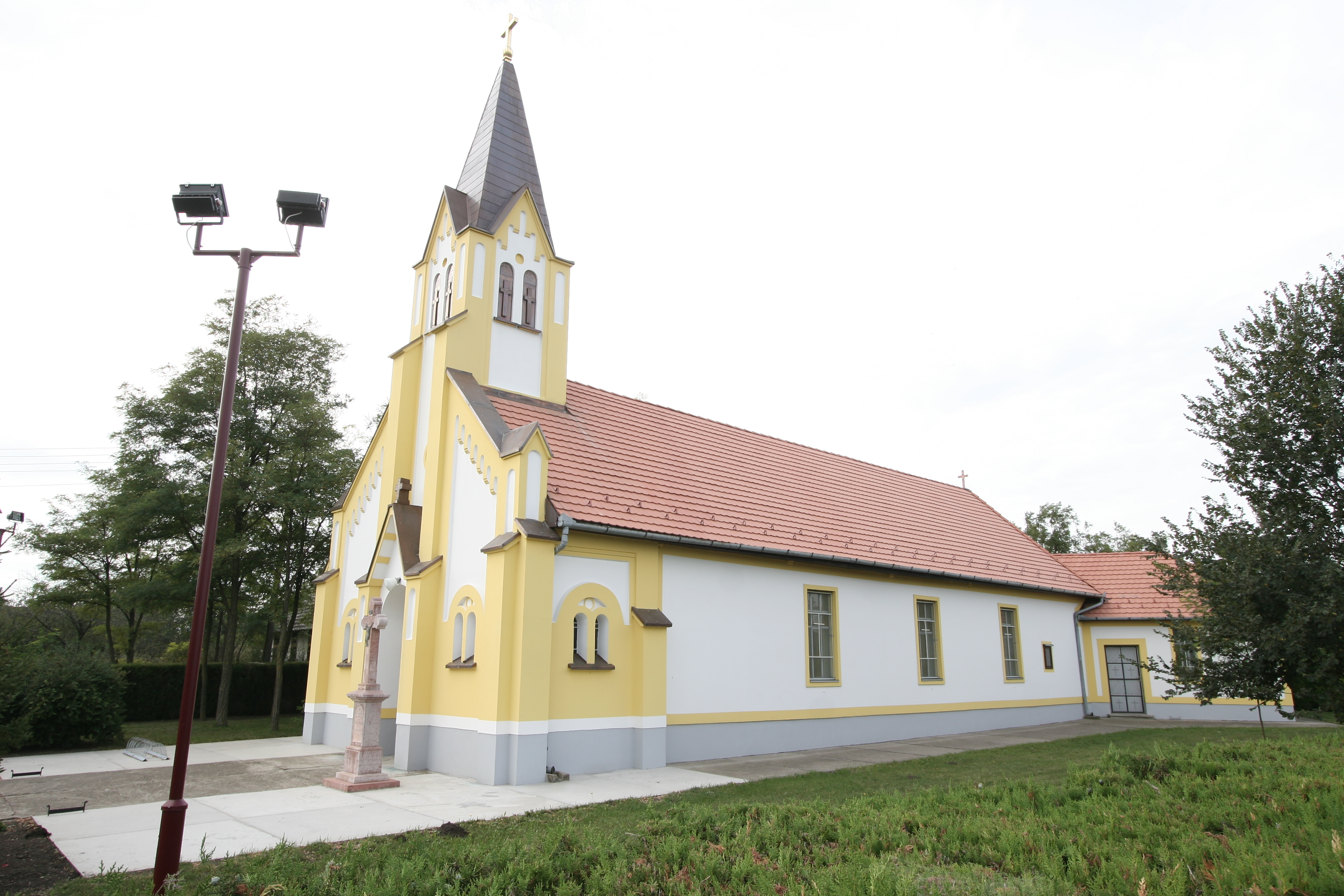
Catholic Church of the Assumption in Bikovo, 1912

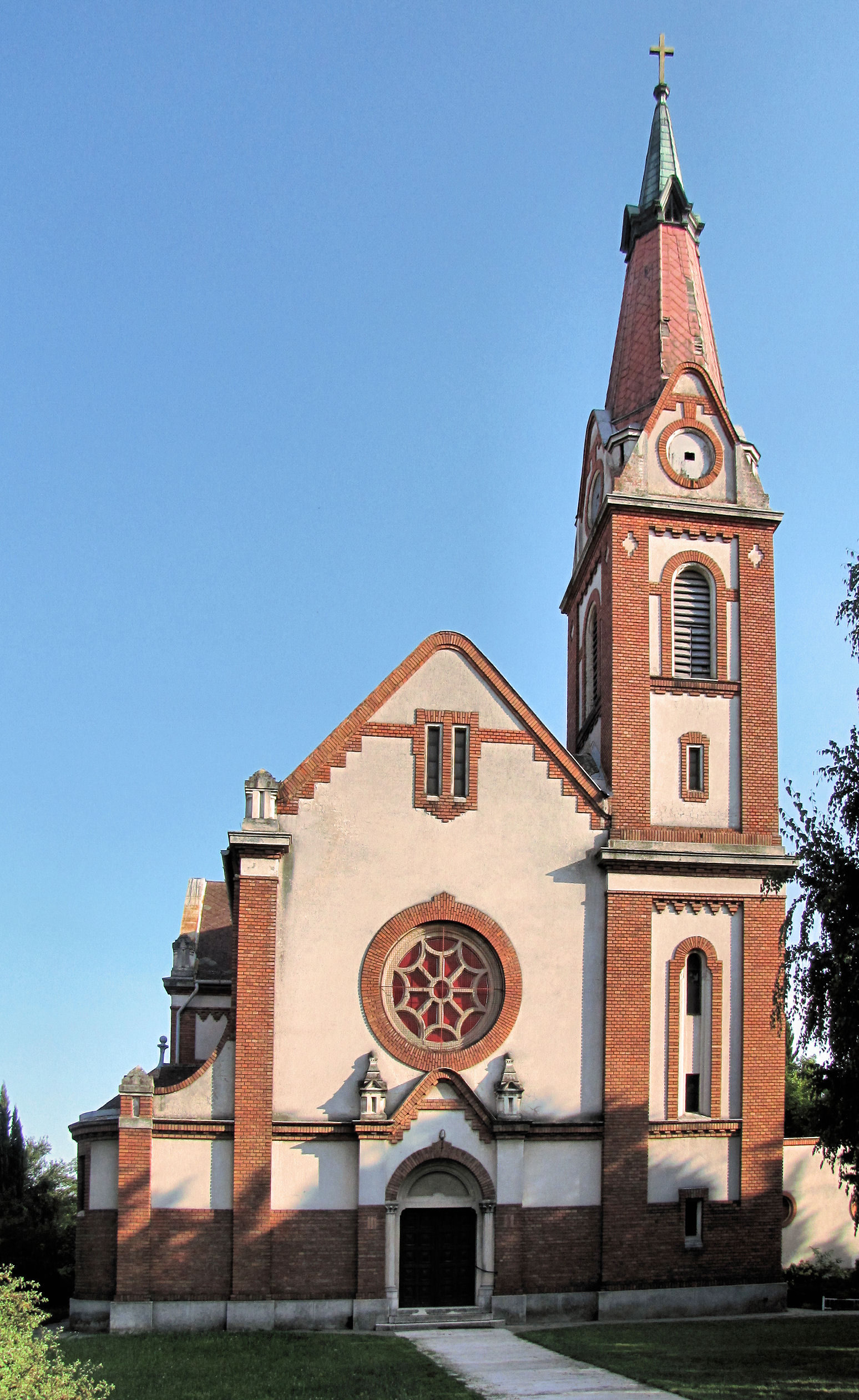
Catholic Church of St. Elizabeth by Mihajl Plavec in Novi Sad, 1931

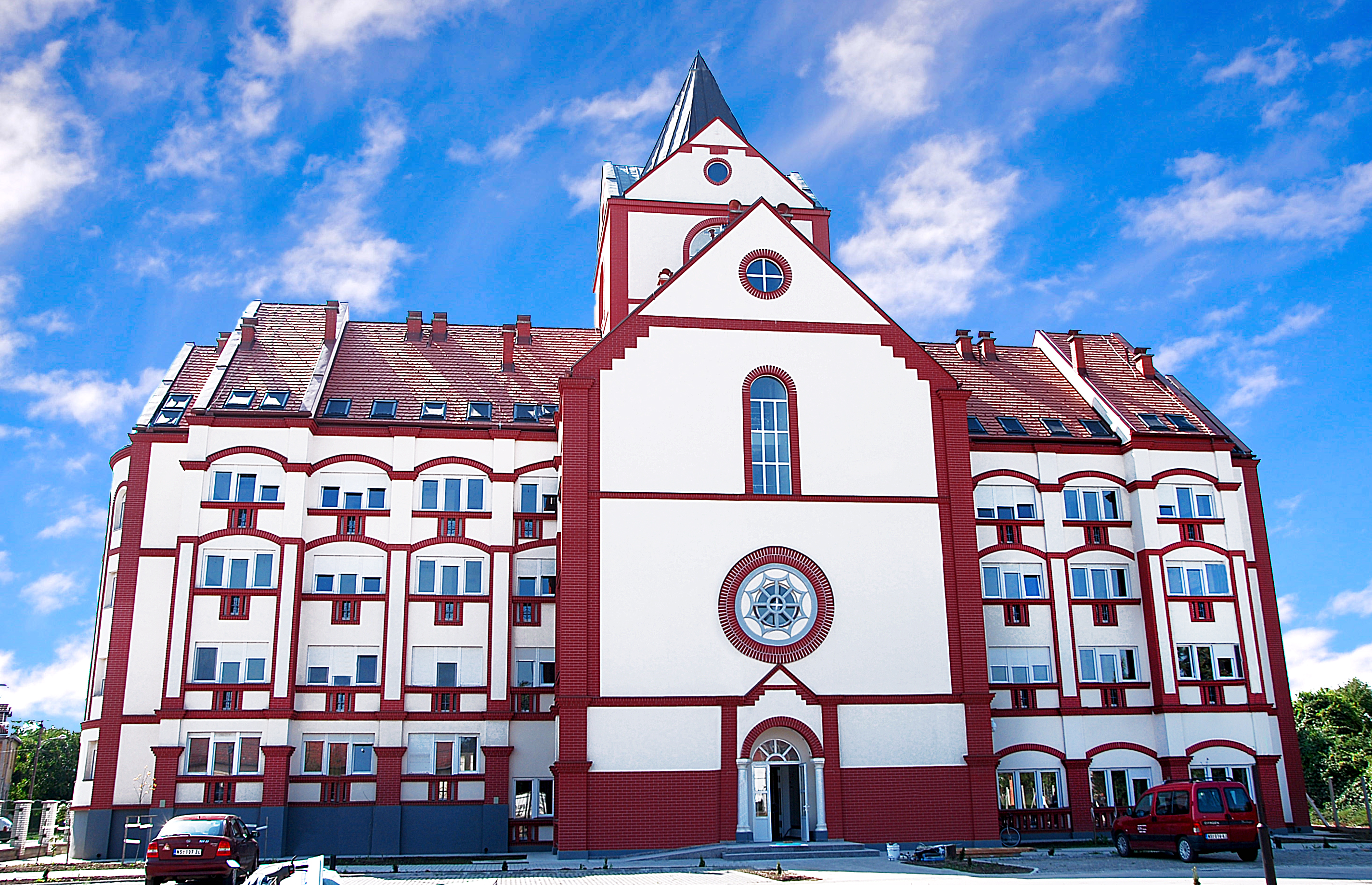
Hungarian Student Dorm "Europe" by Bela Migoi in Novi Sad, 2015

==== Eclecticism and Academic Style ====
Eclecticism was a common architectural movement throughout Serbia in the later half of the 19th and early 20th century. It was a mixture of several historic revival styles common in Western Europe at the time, such as neo-classical, neo-renaissance, neo-romanticism, neo-baroque styles, even Serbo-Byzantine Revival. Most revival styles tended to incorporate eclecticism in exterior and interior designs.

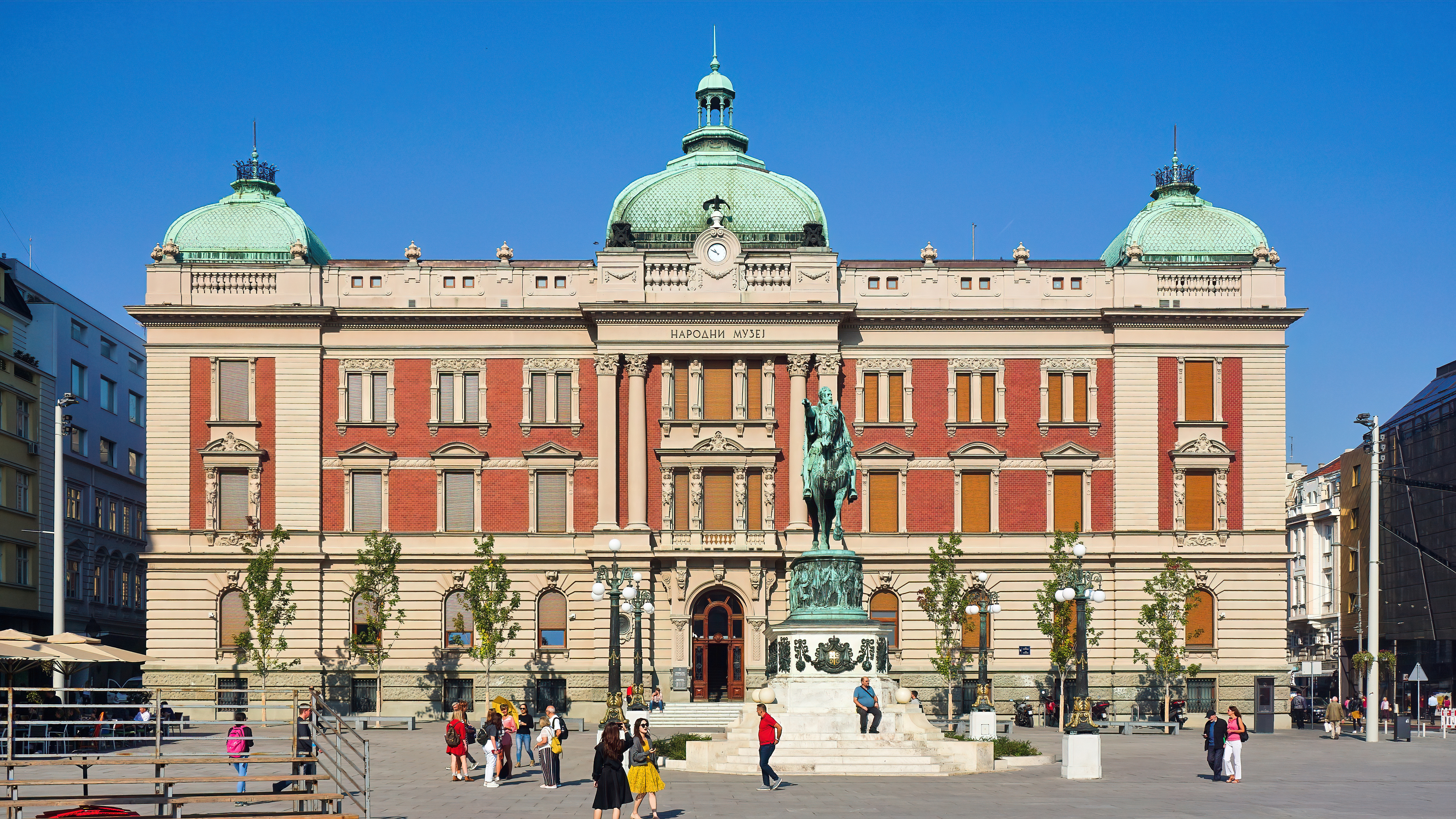
National Museum of Serbia by Andra Stevanović and Nikola Nestorović in Belgrade, 1844

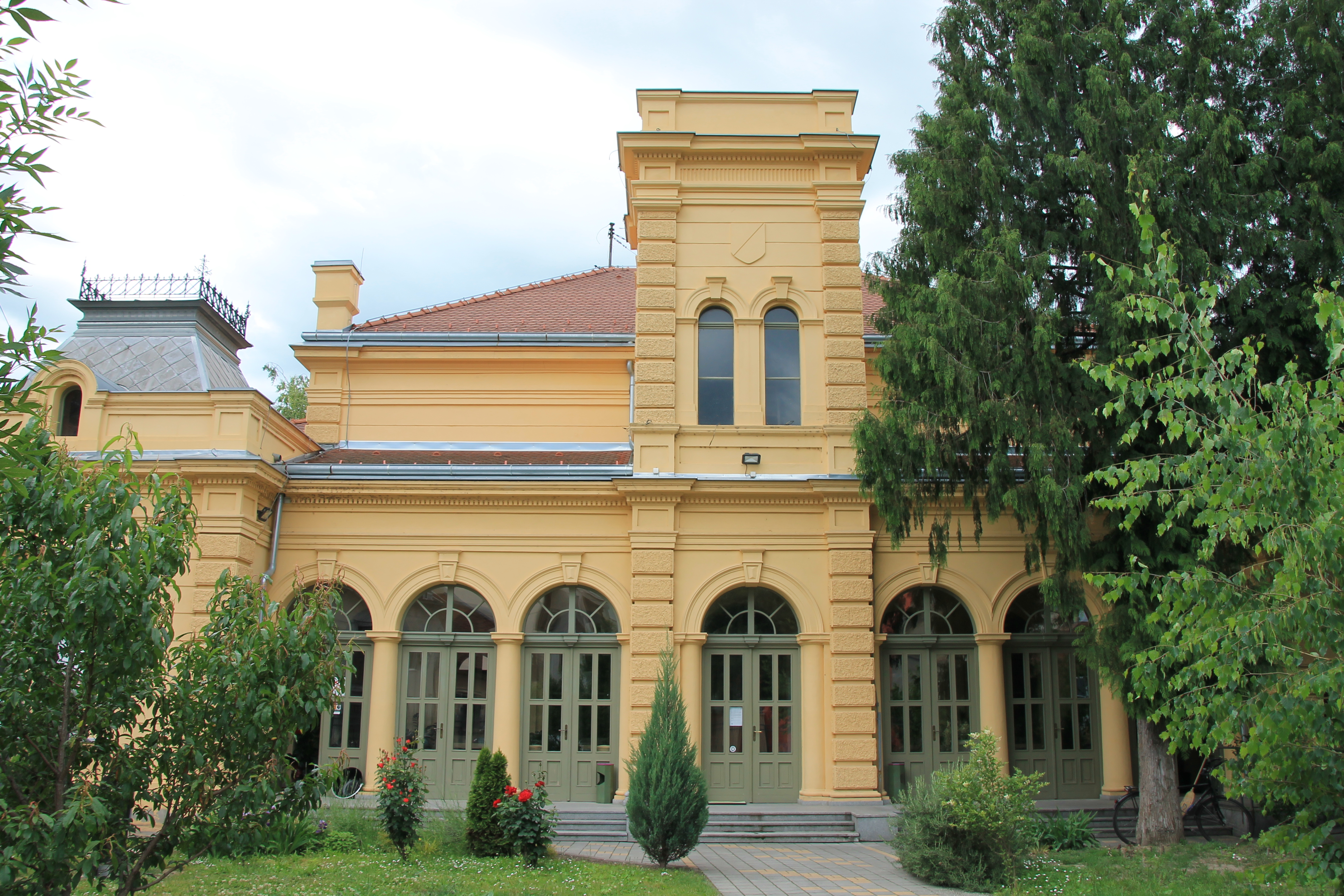
Eđšeg Castle by György Molnár and Karl Lehrer in Novi Sad, 1890

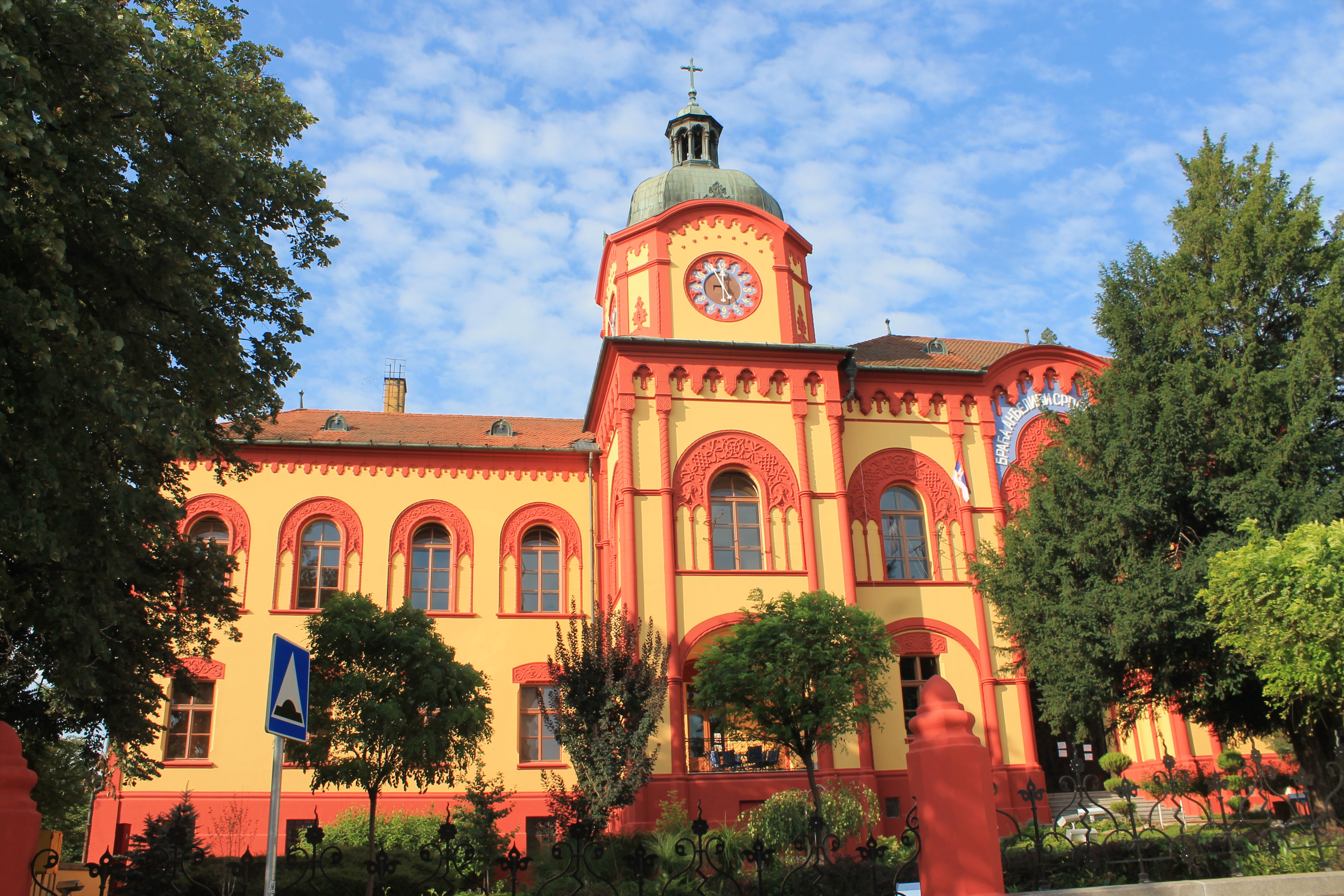
Karlovci Gymnasium by Gyula Pártos and Ödön Lechner in Sremski Karlovci, 1891

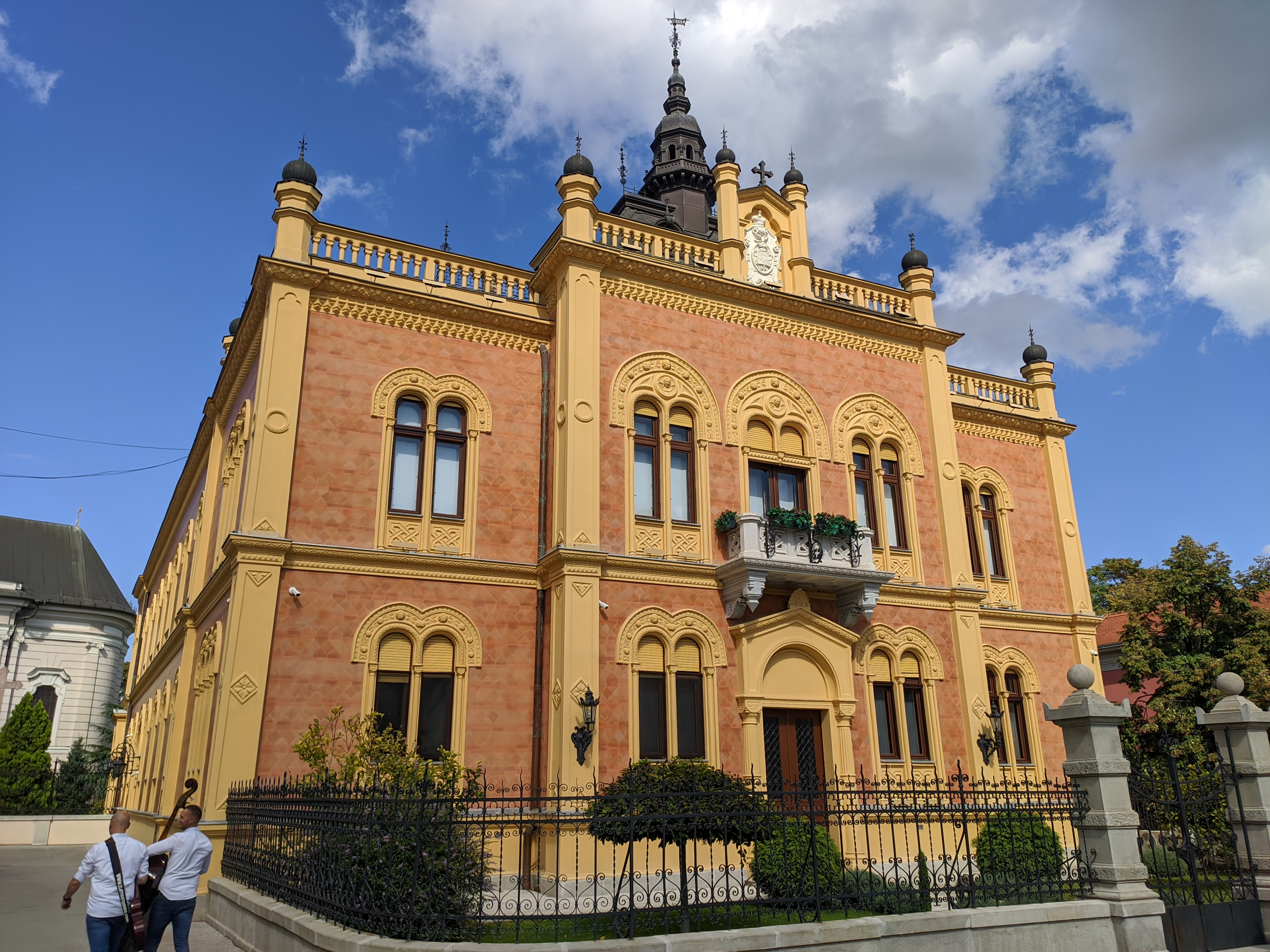
Bishop's Palace by Vladimir Nikolić in Novi Sad, 1901

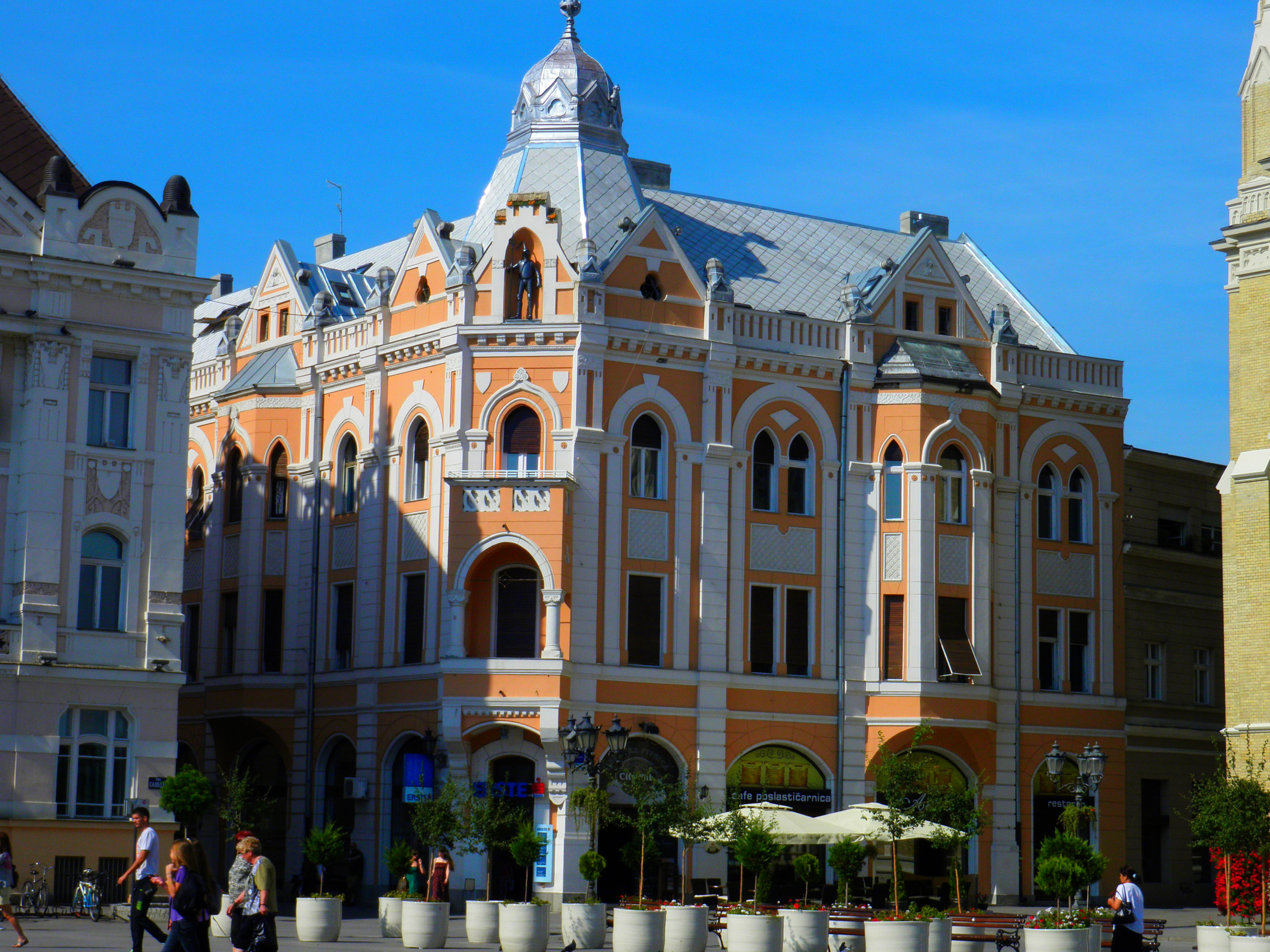
Iron Man Palace by Bela Paklo and Károly Kovács in Novi Sad, 1909

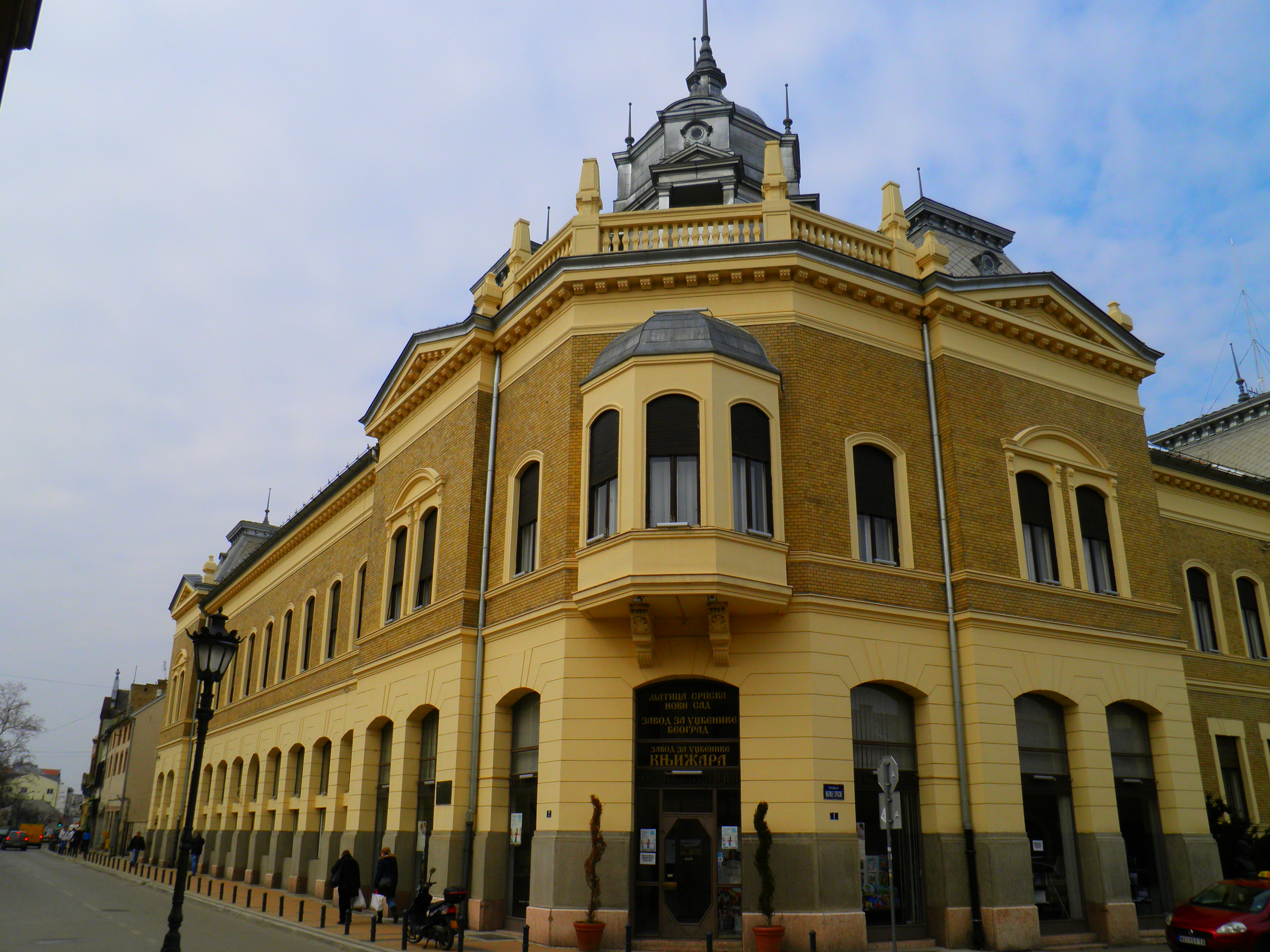
Matica Srpska by Momčilo Tapavica in Novi Sad, 1912

==== Classical Revival ====
Neoclassicism movement was concentrated in large city centers such as Belgrade, used for important institutions and religious buildings between the 18th and early 20th centuries. It would often be used as a basis design element for other historic revival styles at the time (most notable Neo-baroque), contributing to eclecticism. Pure classical revival architecture of Western Rome and ancient Greece as seen in other European countries is rare in Serbia, due to the more common movement towards Eastern Roman, or Byzantine, architectural designs reminiscent of medieval Serbian architecture.

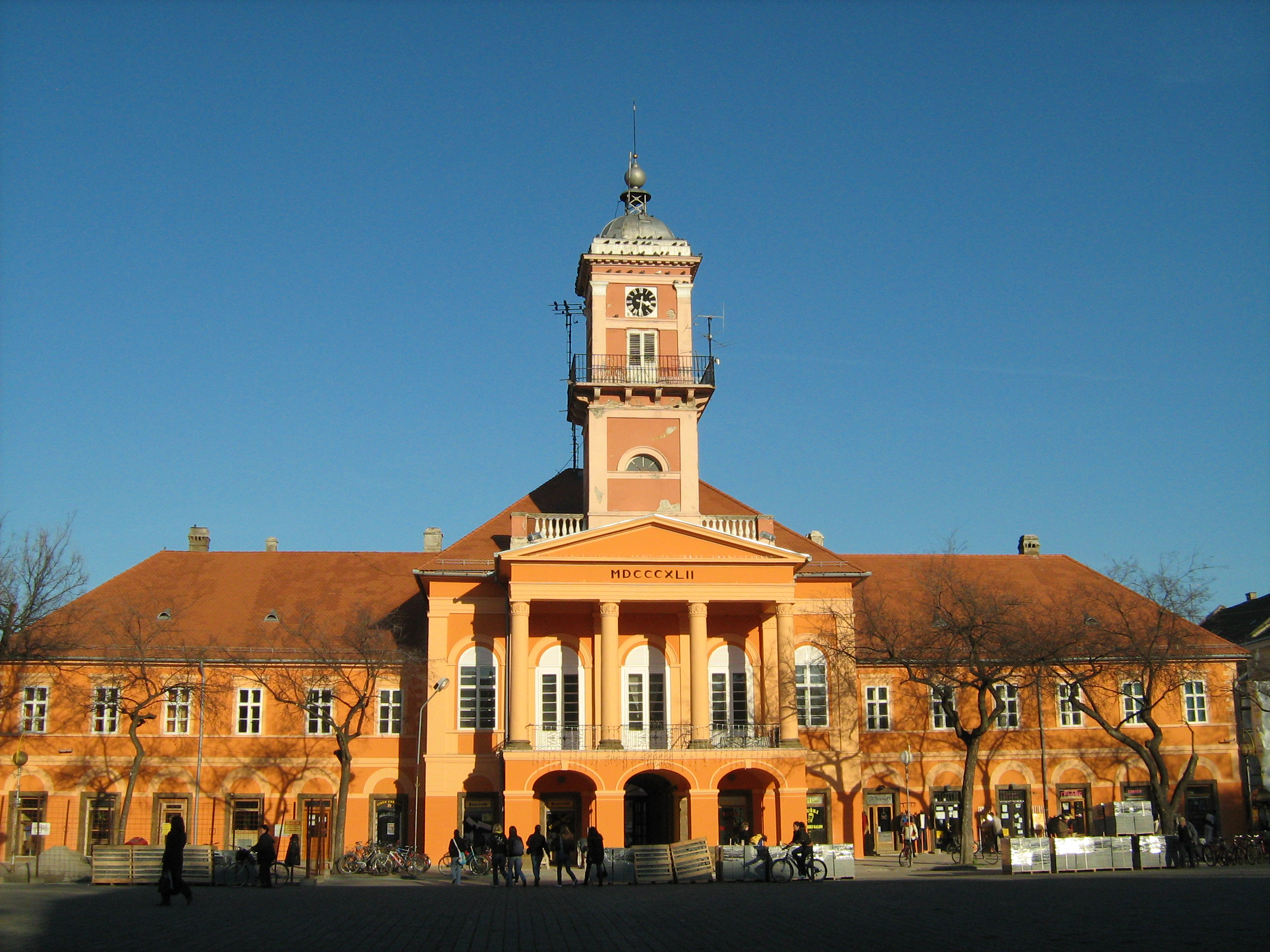
Old City Hall in Sombor, 1749

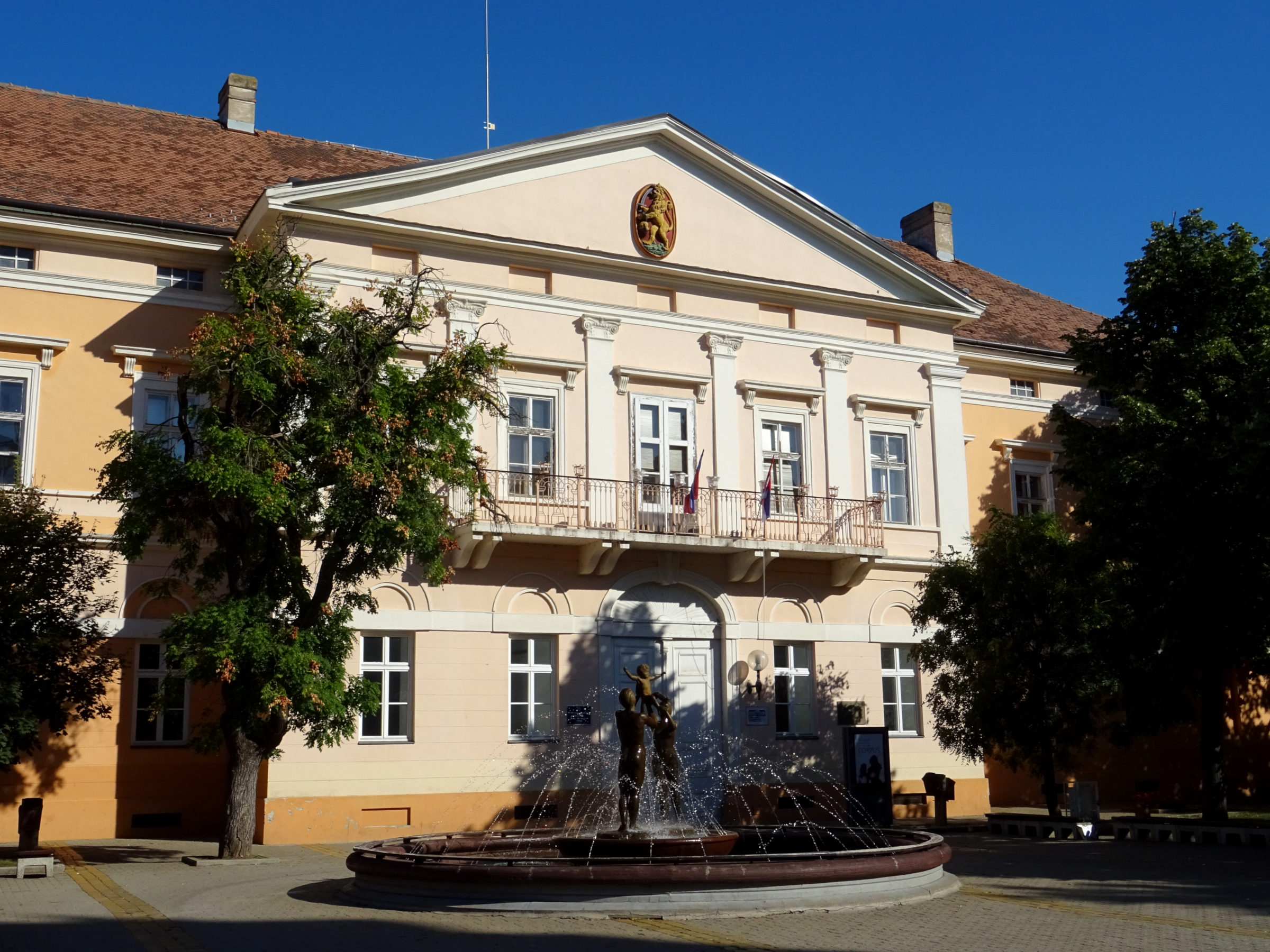
People's Museum in Kikinda, 1839

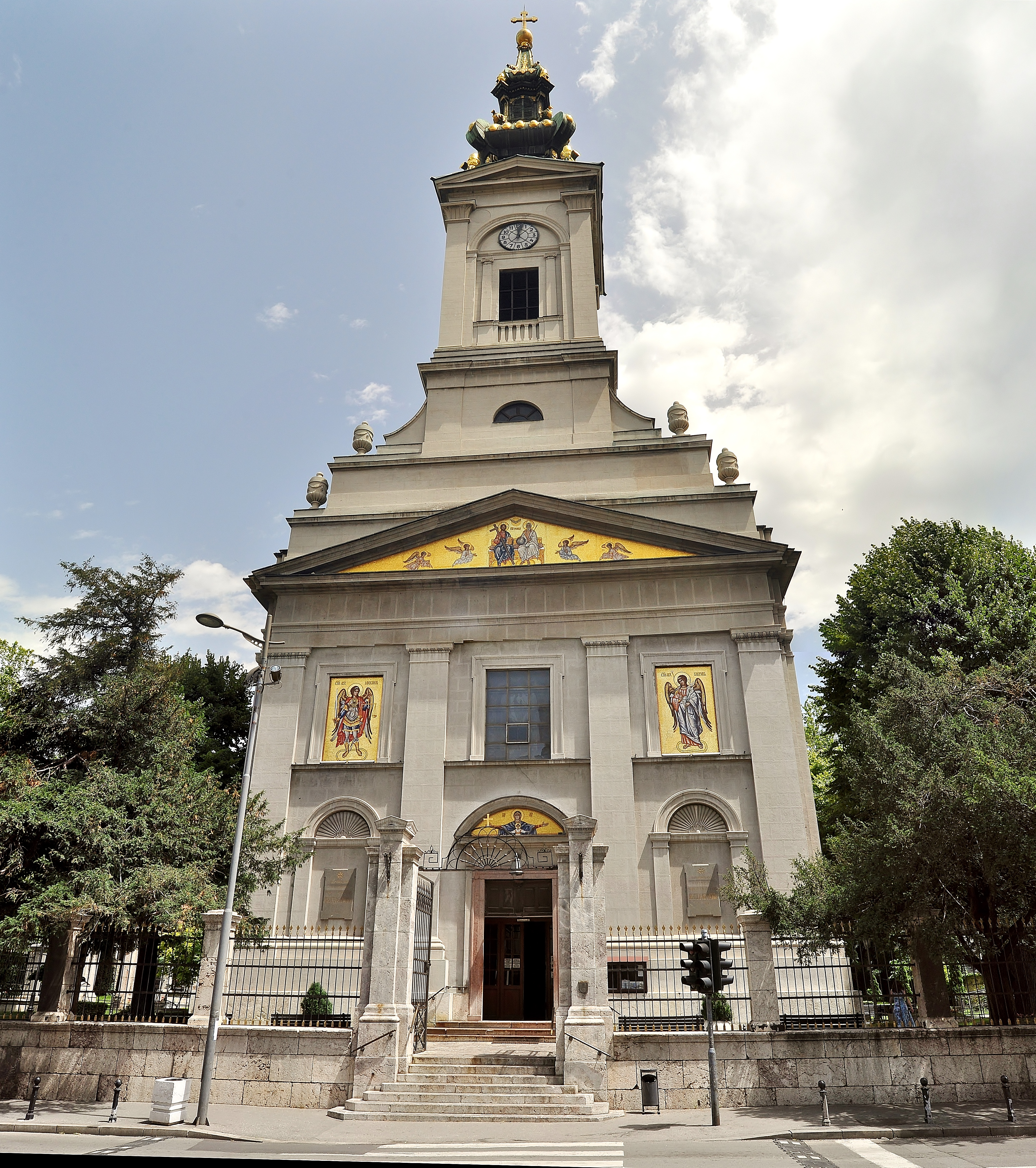
Orthodox Cathedral of St. Michael the Archangel by Adam Friedrich Kwerfeld in Belgrade, 1840

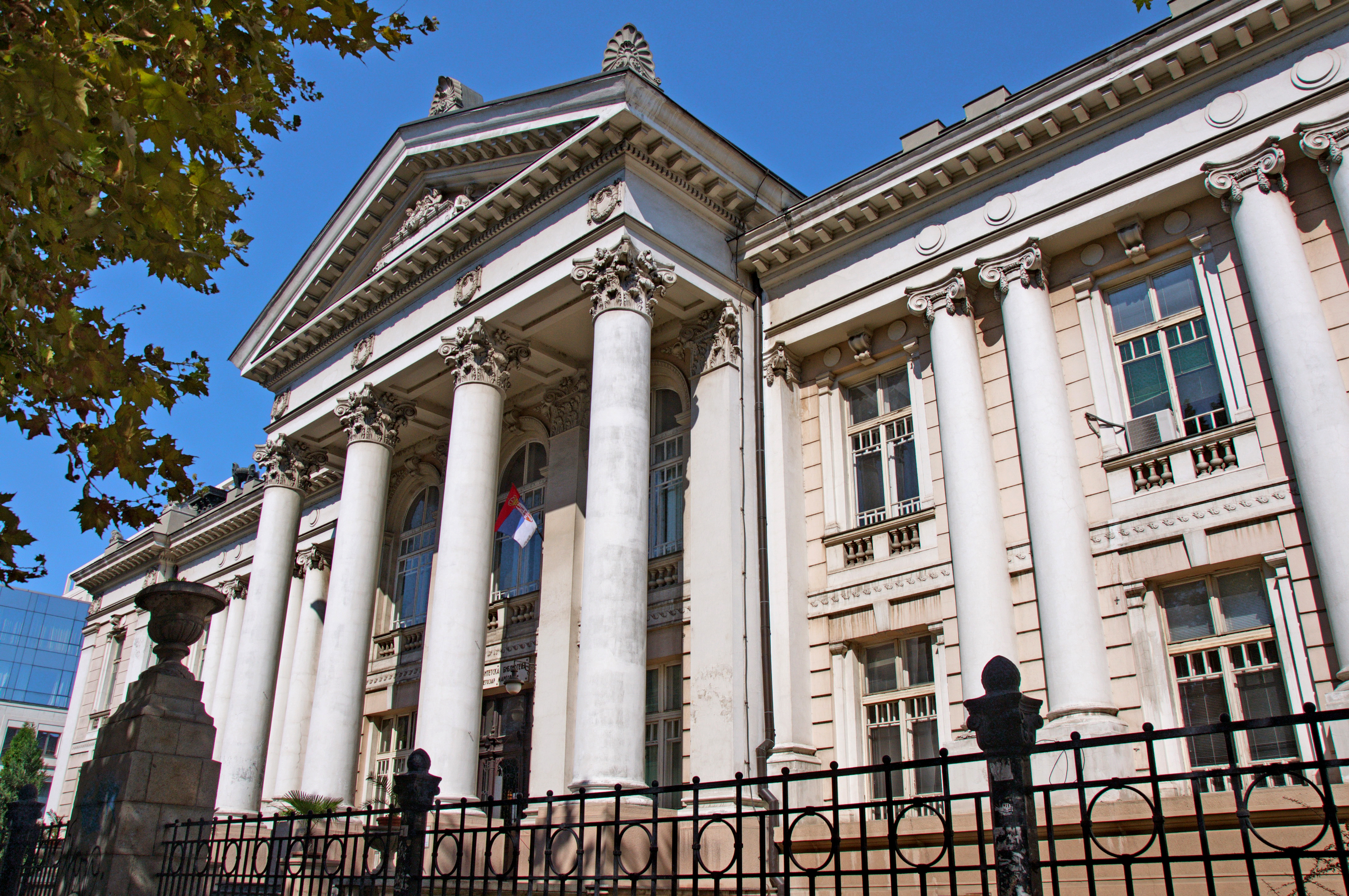
University Library Svetozar Marković by Dragutin Đordjević and Nikola Nestorović in Belgrade, 1844

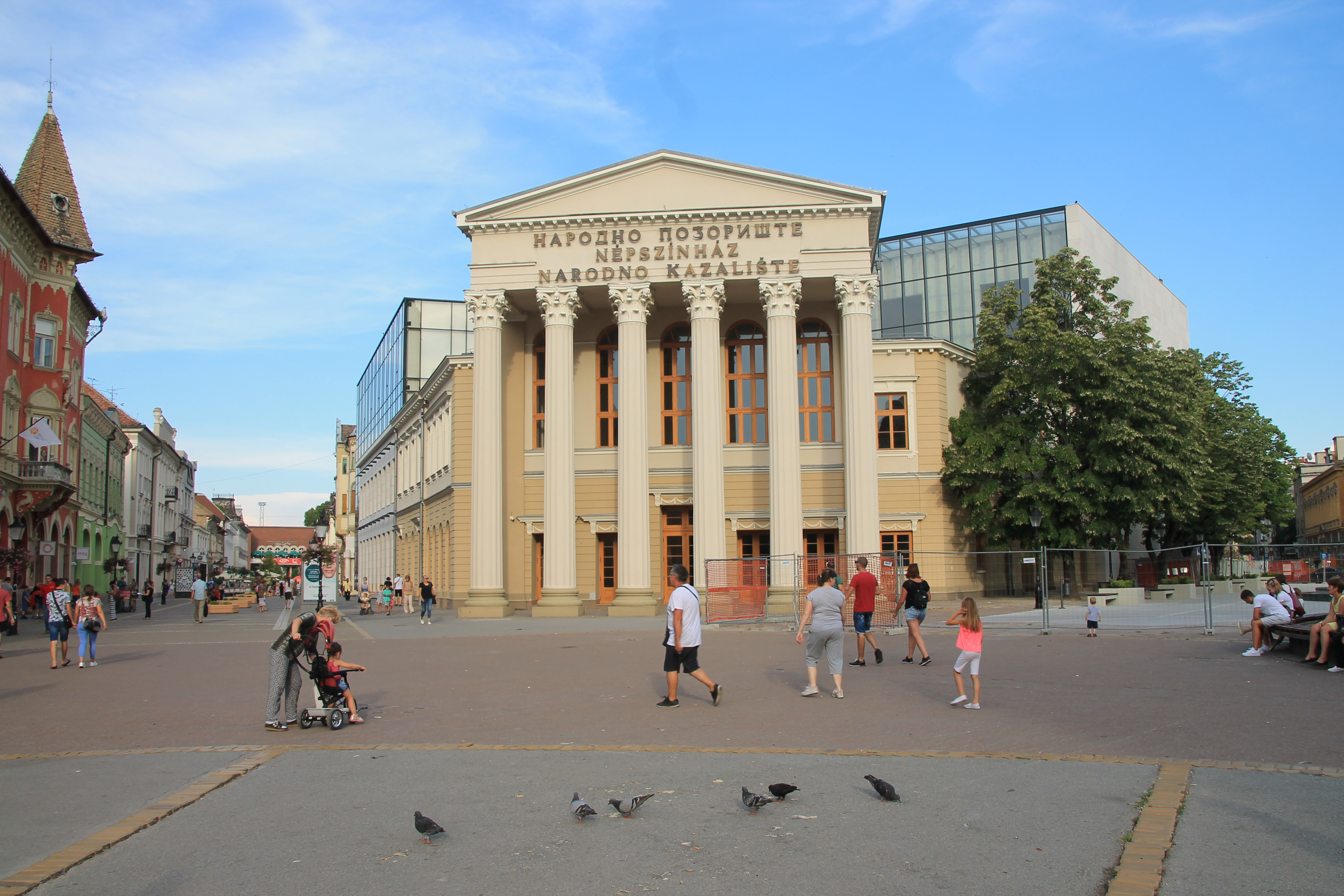
National Theatre in Subotica, 1854

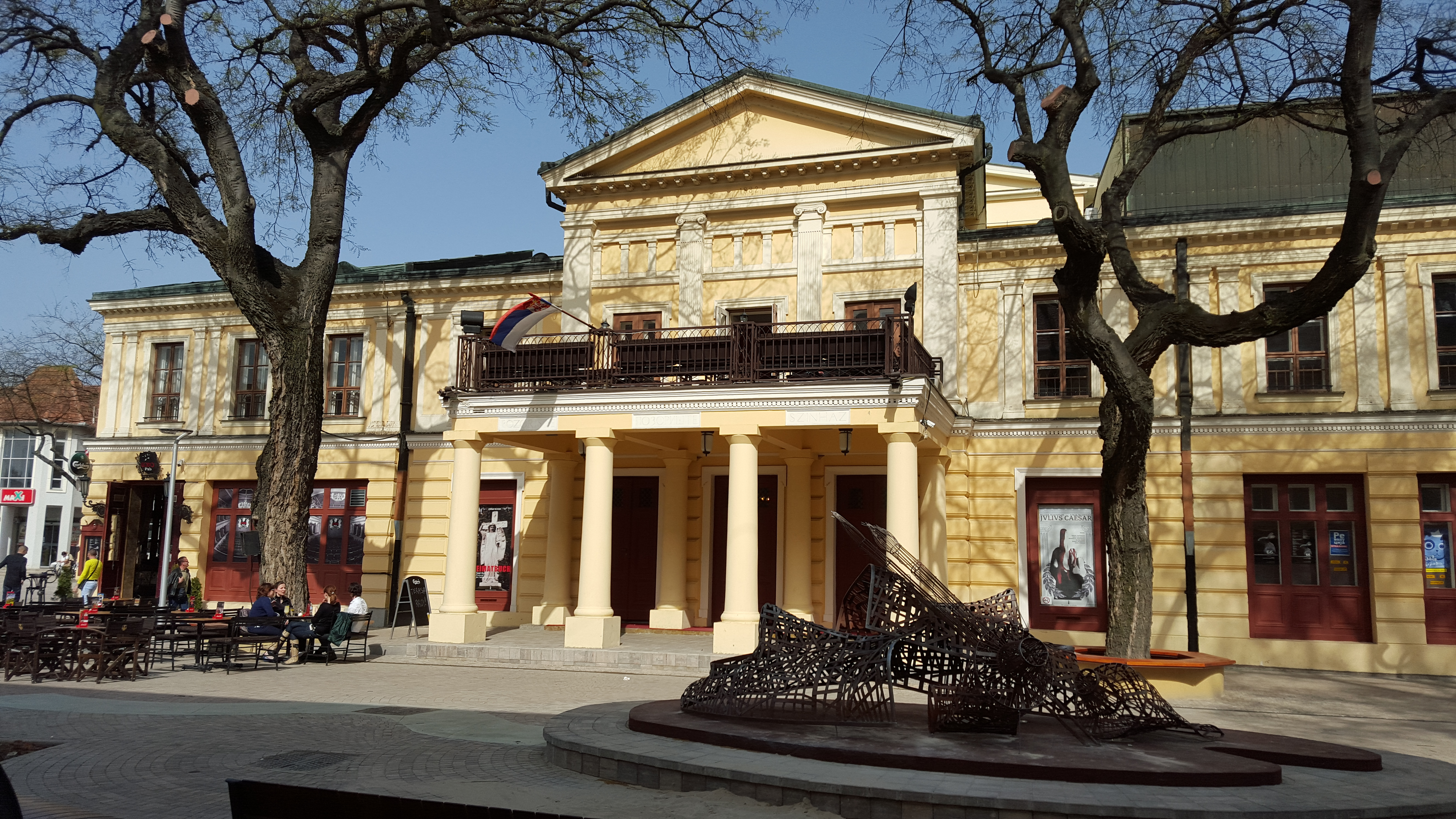
National Theater by Adolf Vajte in Sombor, 1882

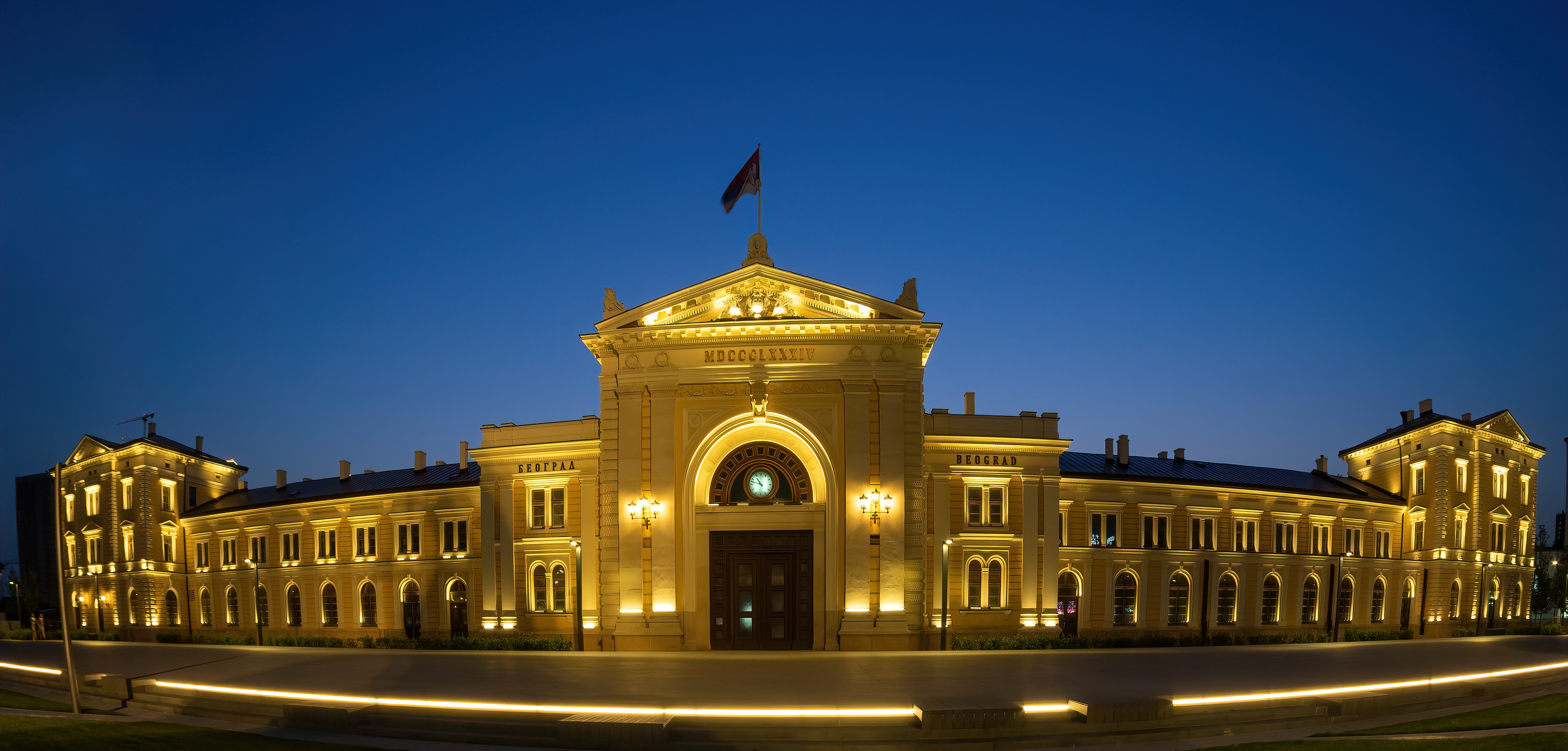
Old Main railway station by Dragutin Milutinović in Belgrade, 1884

==== Renaissance Revival ====
Renaissance Revival architecture was a short lived movement at the end of the 19th century, mostly relegated to few buildings in Vojvodina province, with fewer examples in southern cities, such as Belgrade and Niš.

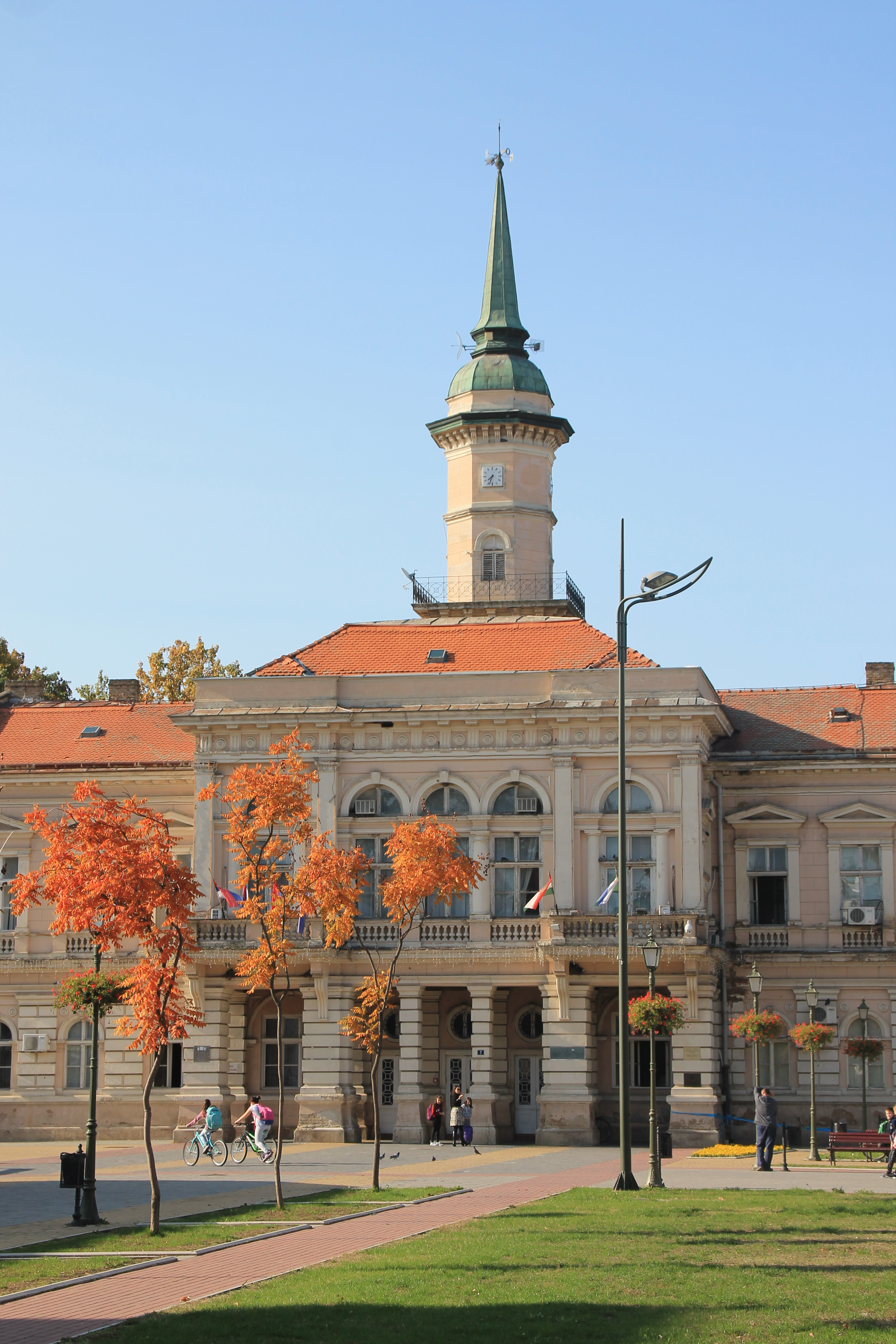
City Hall in Bečej, 1880

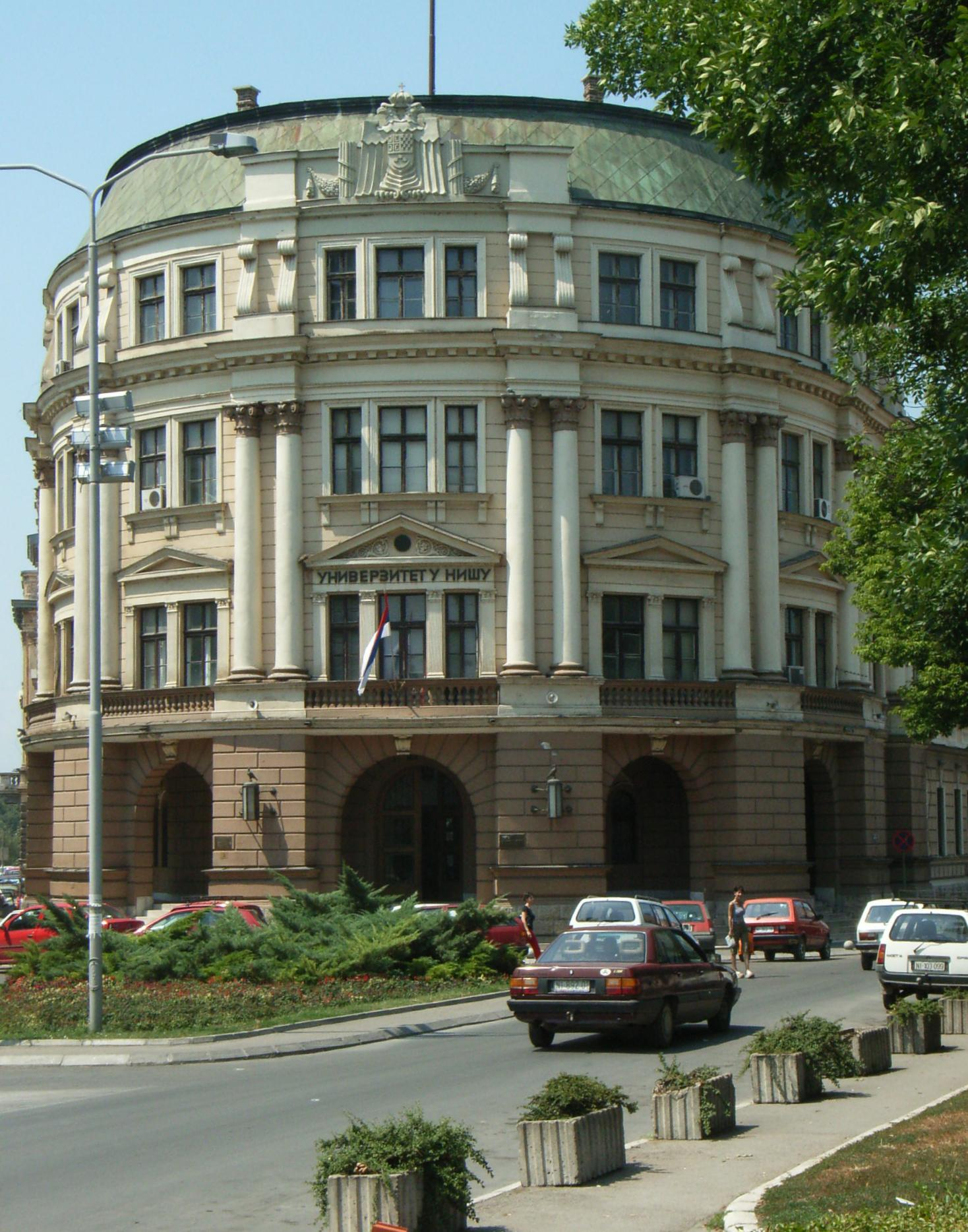
Morava Banovina Palace in Niš, 1886

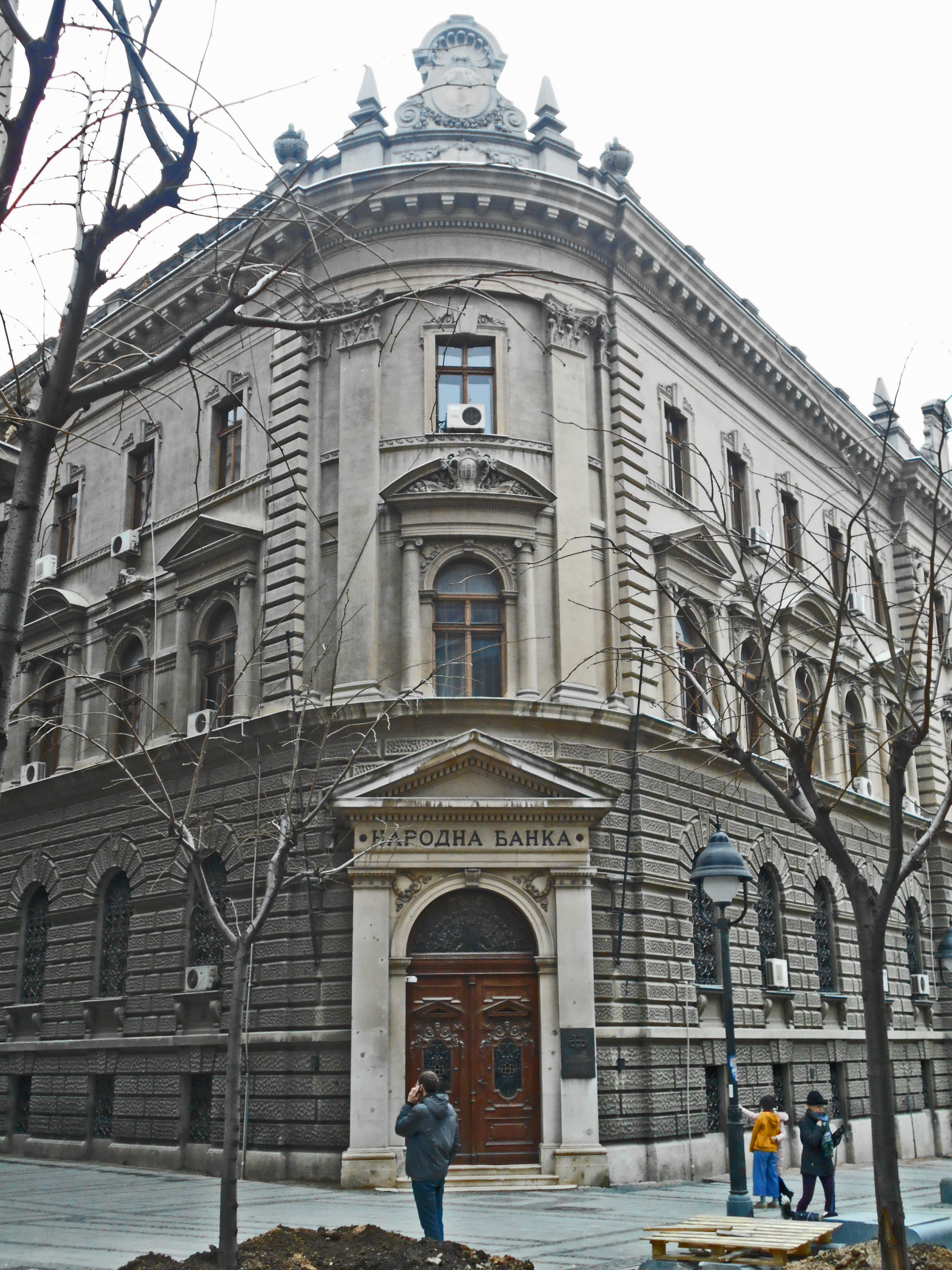
National Bank Building by Konstantin and Anastas Jovanović in Belgrade, 1890

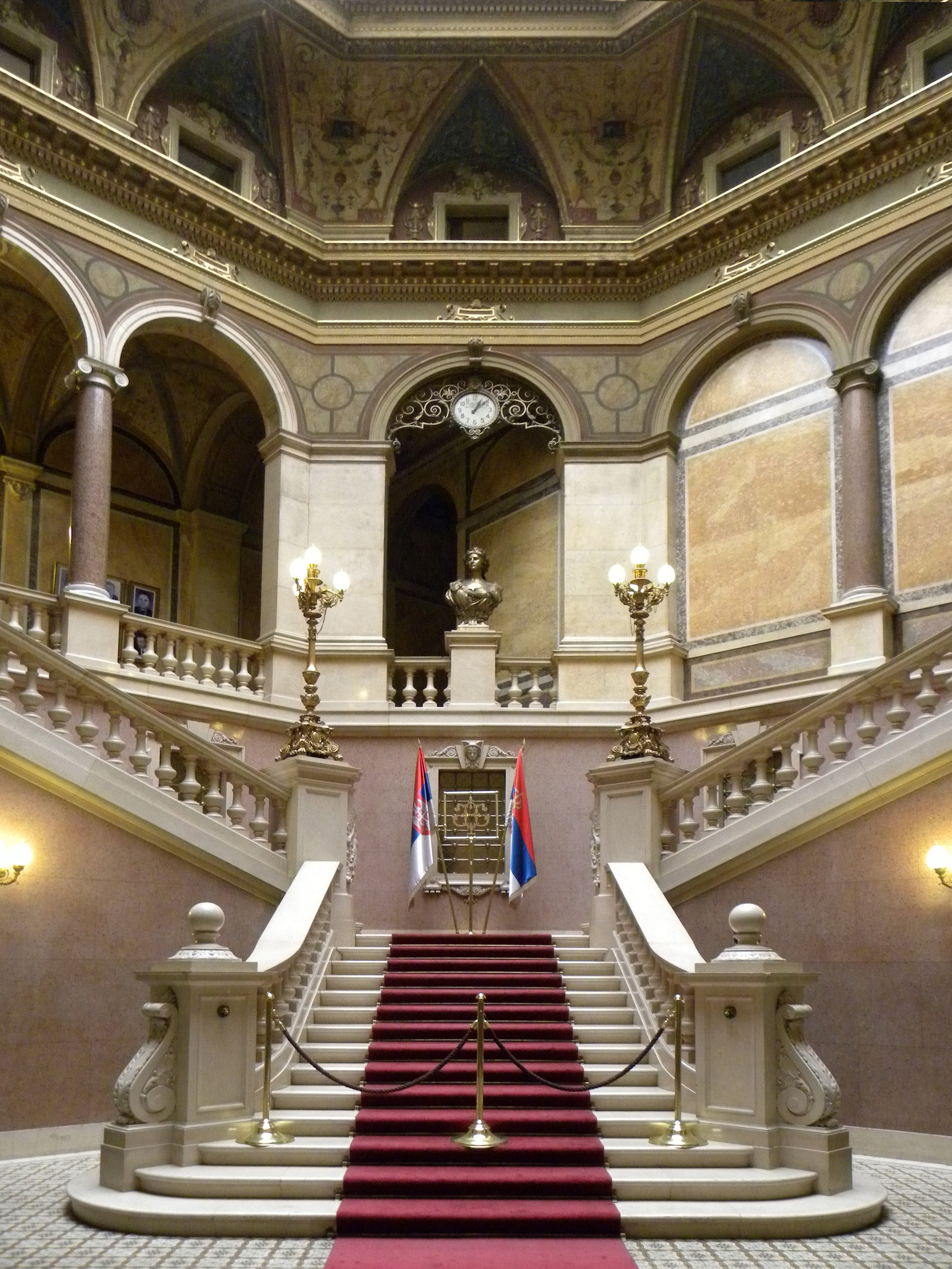
Interior of the National Bank Building in Belgrade, 1890

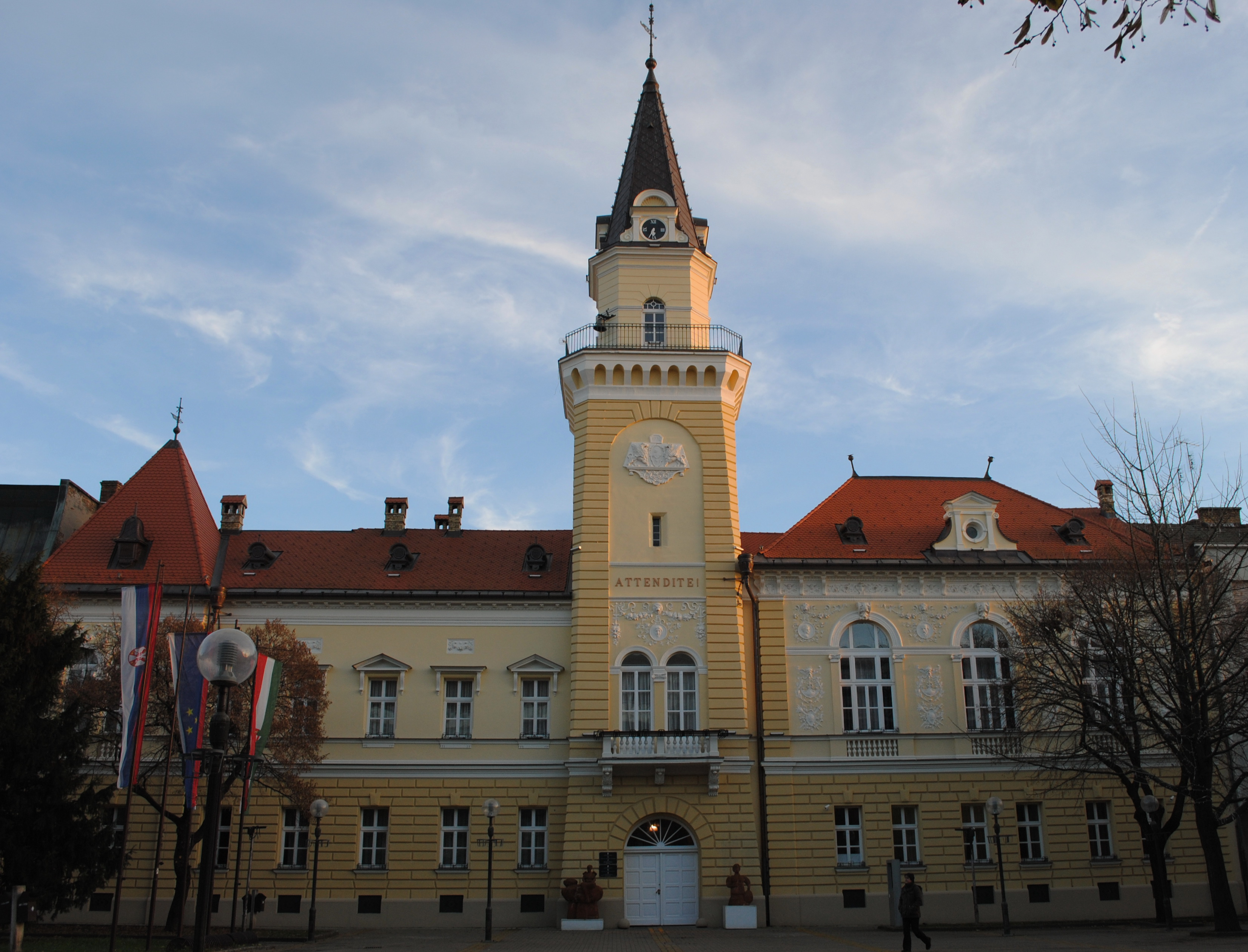
City Hall in Kikinda, 1893

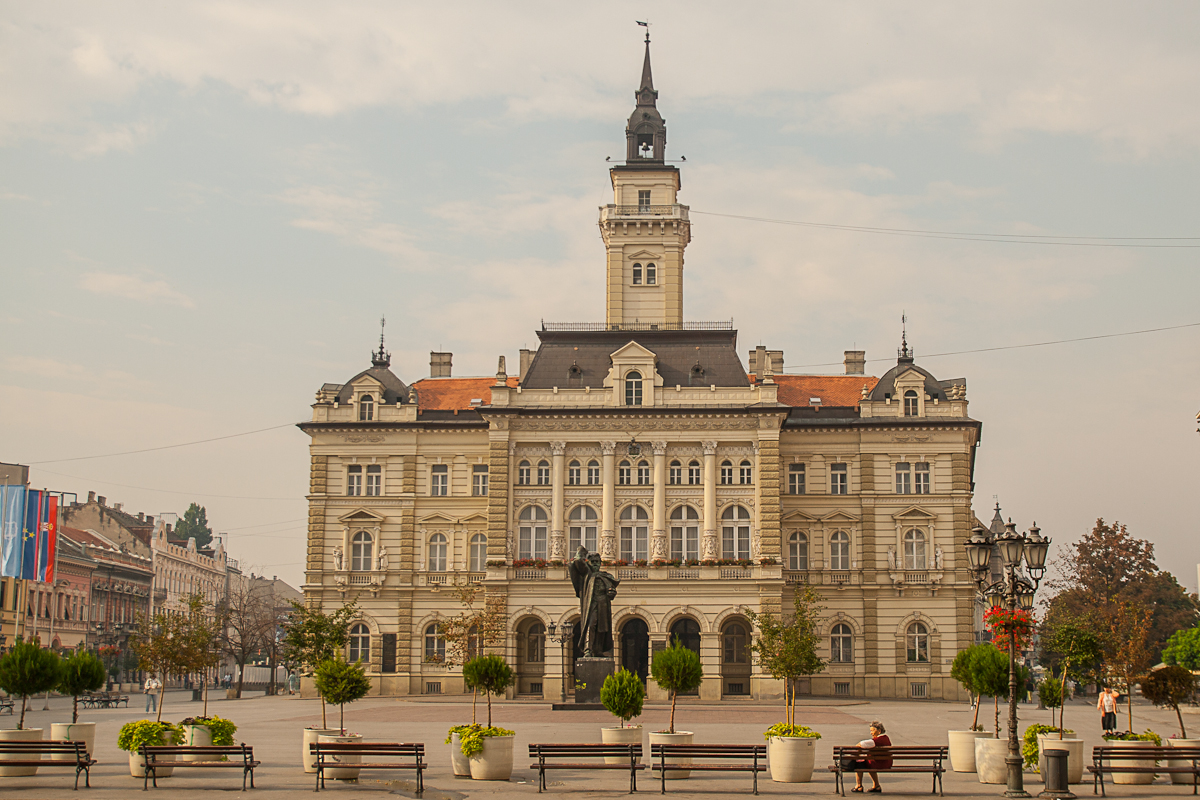
City Hall by György Molnár in Novi Sad, 1895

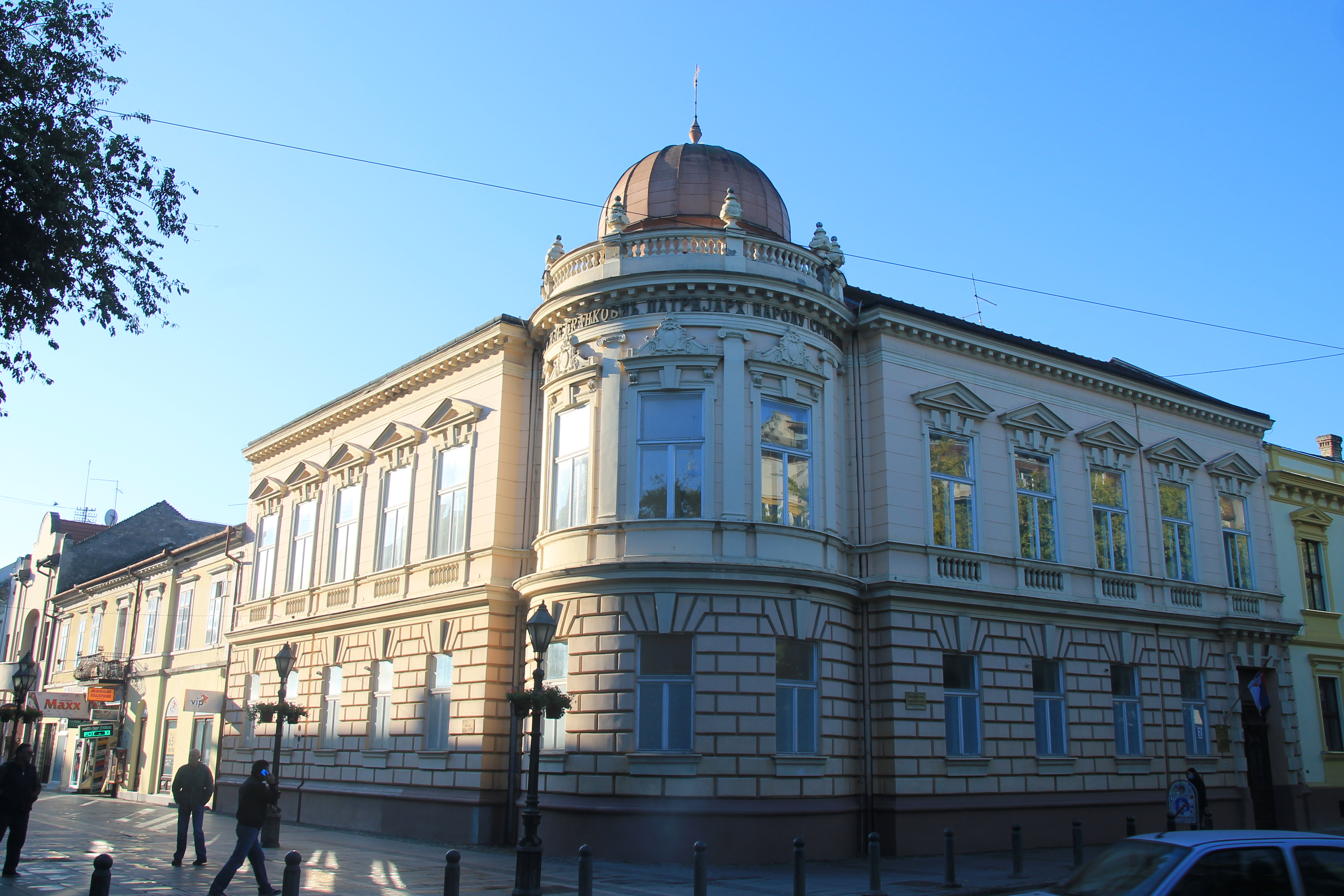
Preparandija by Georgije Branković in Sombor, 1895

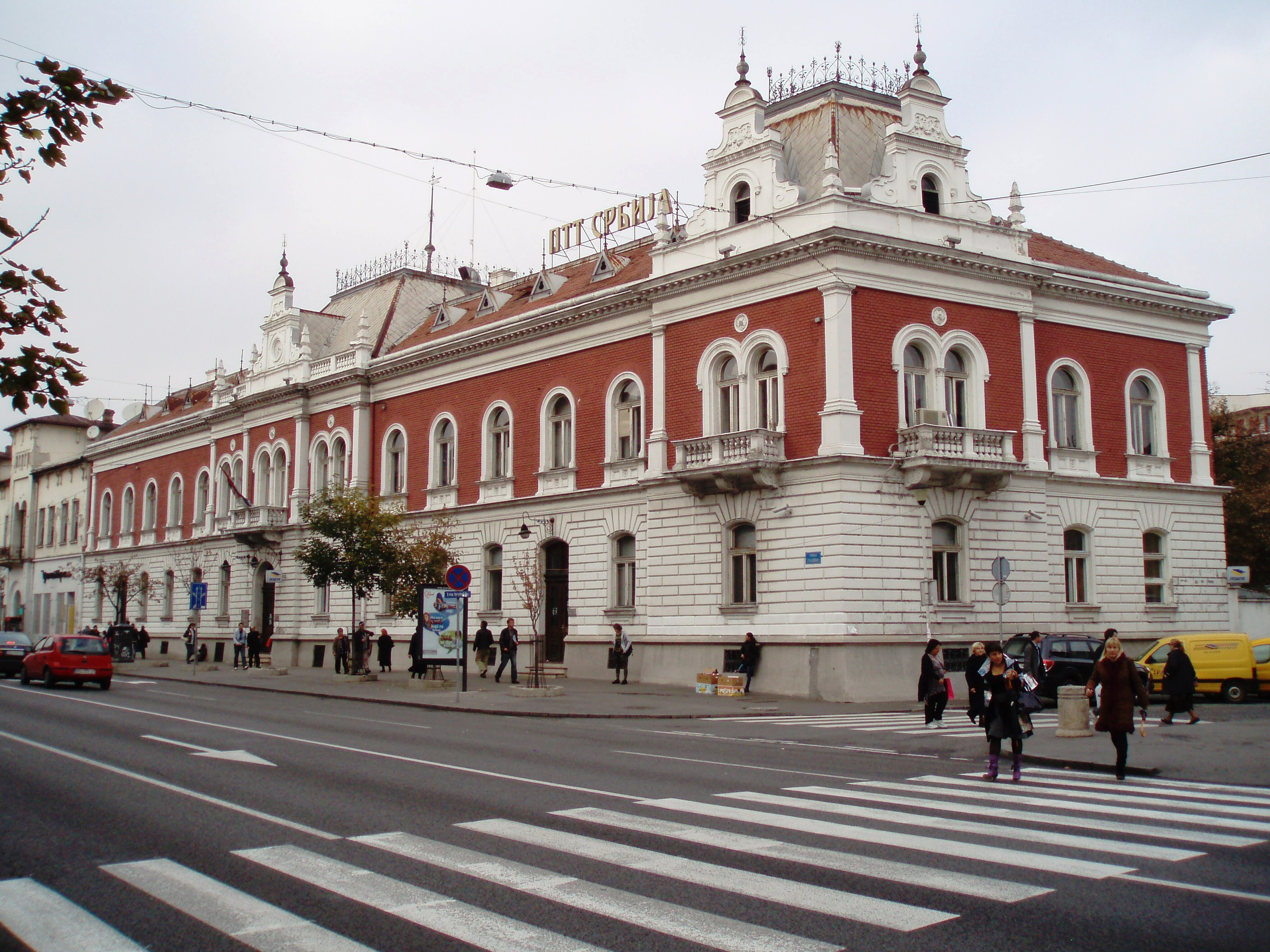
Post Office by Franjo Jenč in Zemun, Belgrade, 1896

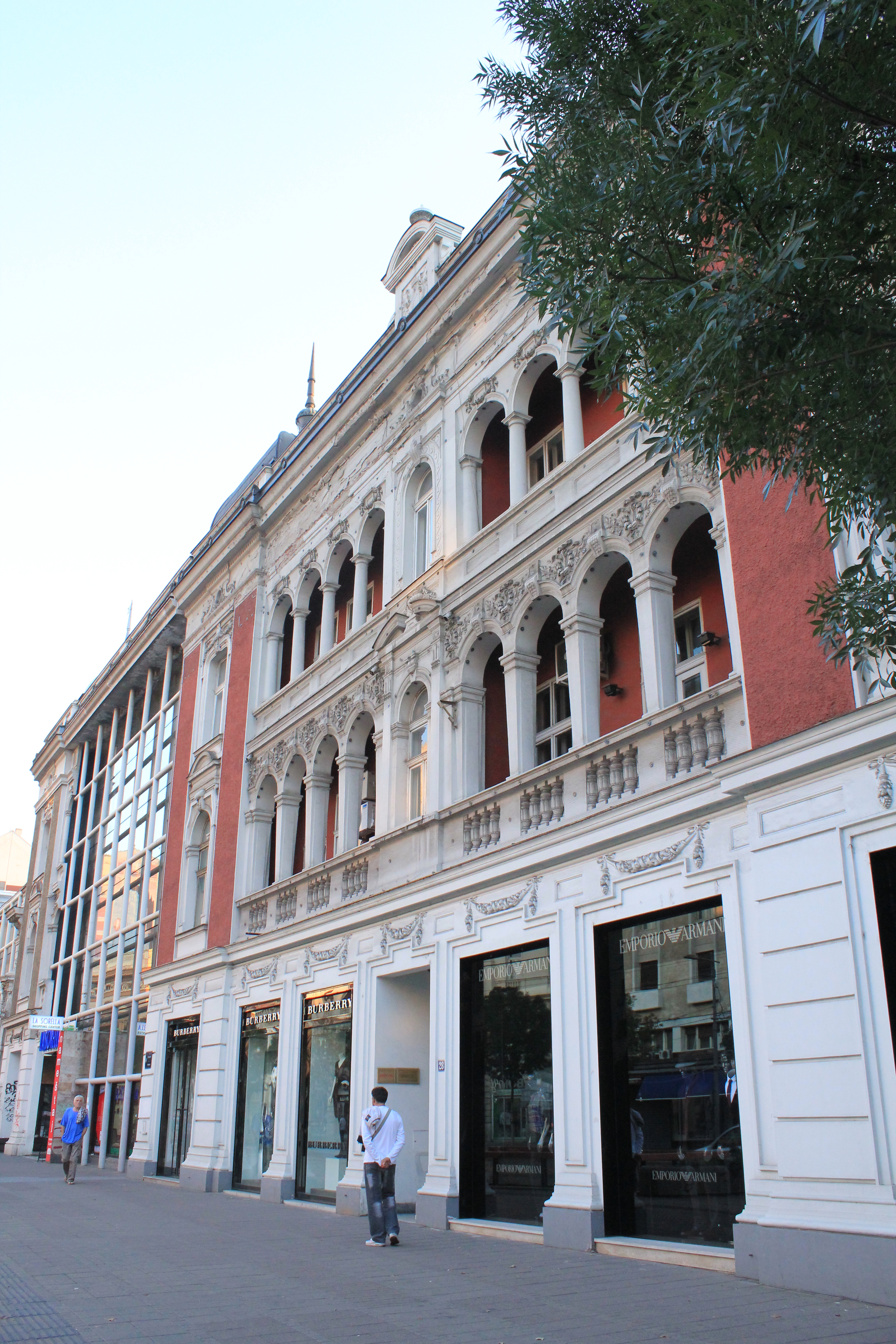
Palace Atina by Dimitrije T. Leko in Belgrade, 1902

==== Baroque Revival ====
Neo-baroque movement occurred at in the late 19th century, often mixing classic baroque architecture elements with existing architecture movements at the time, especially neo-classical and secession styles.

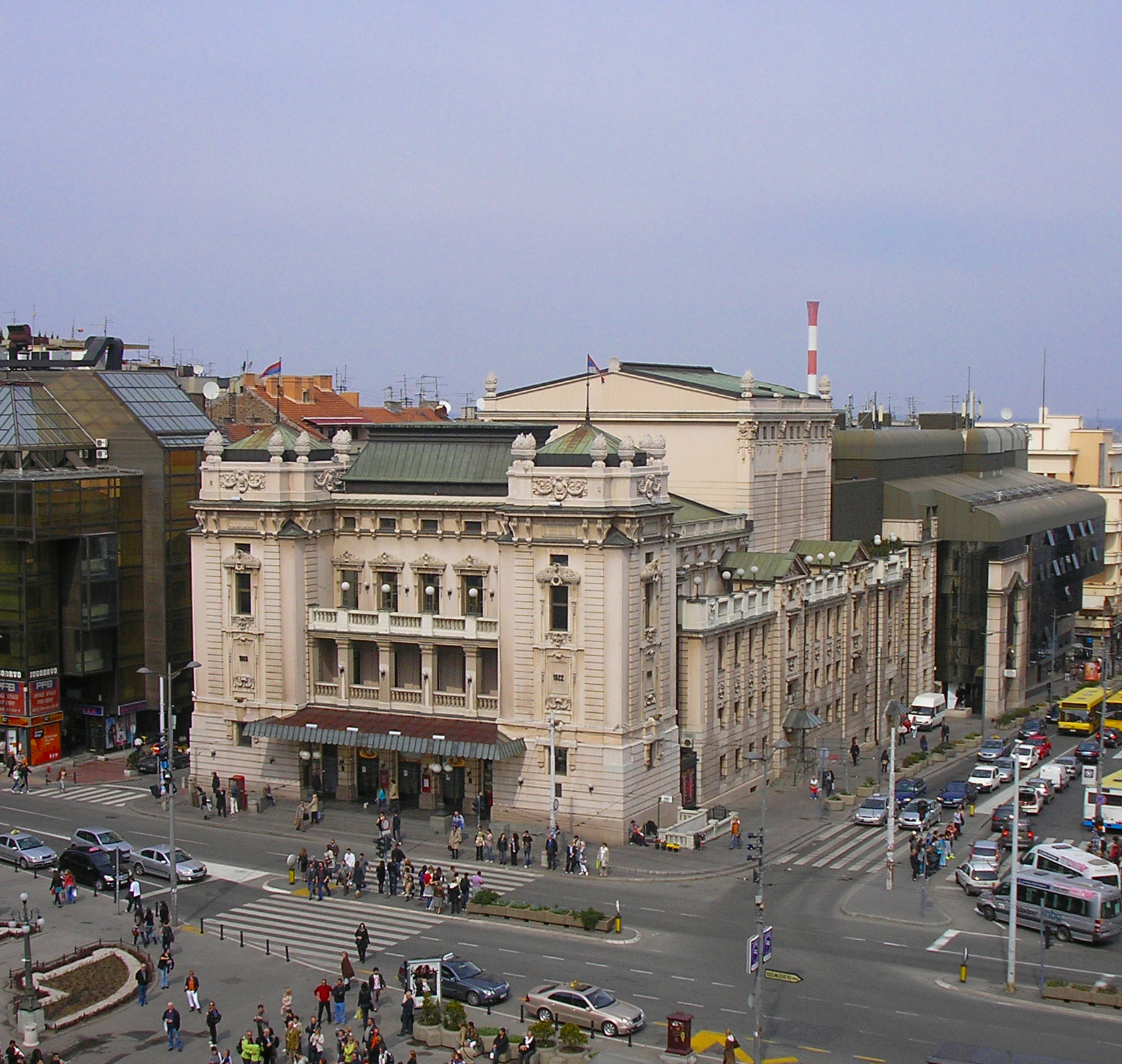
National Theatre in Belgrade, 1869

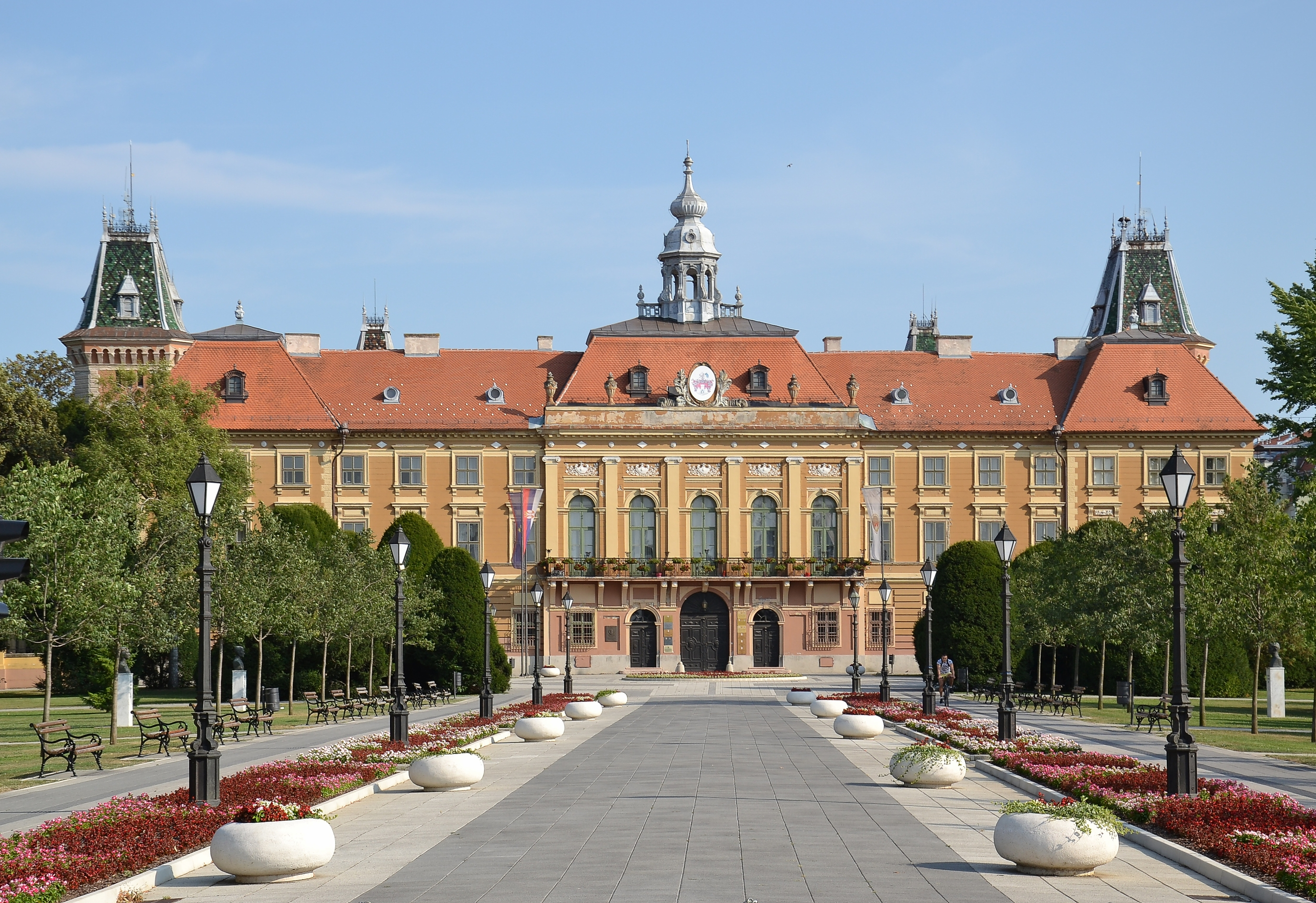
City Hall by Jozef Bauer and Gyula Pártos in Sombor, 1882

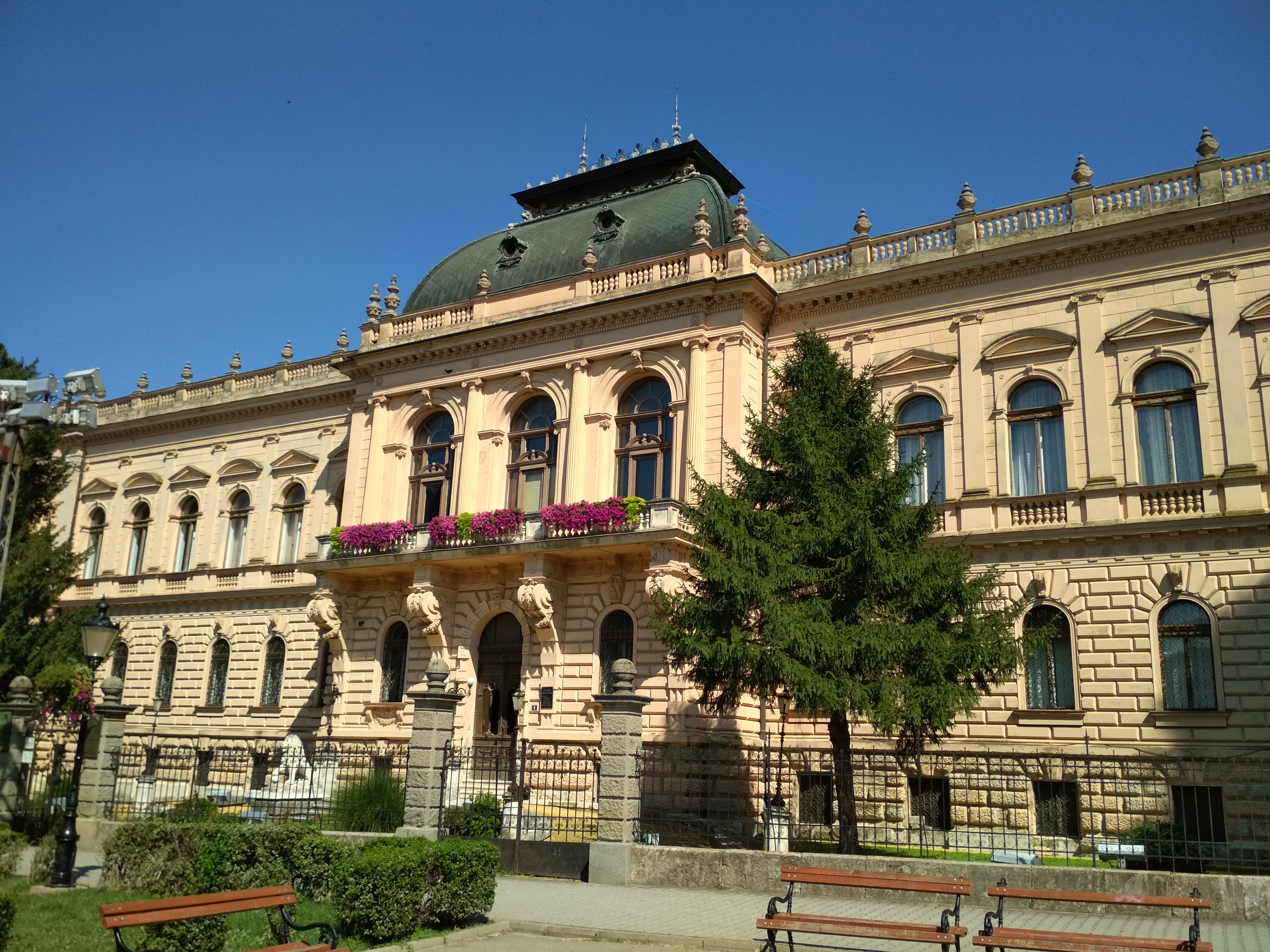
Patriarchate Court by Vladimir Nikolić in Sremski Karlovci, 1895

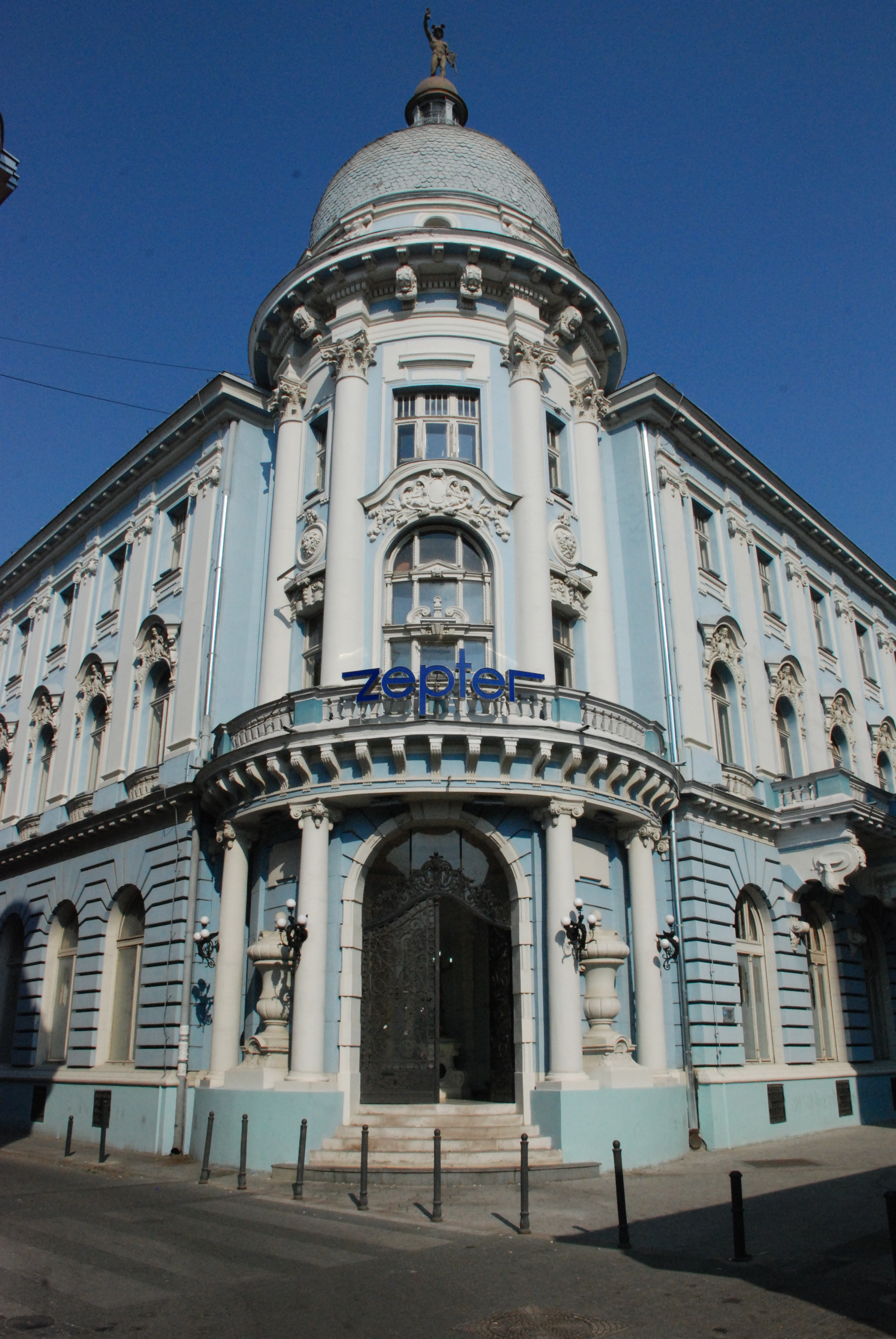
Central Credit Institute by Frantz Voruda and Đorđe Jovanović in Novi Sad, 1896

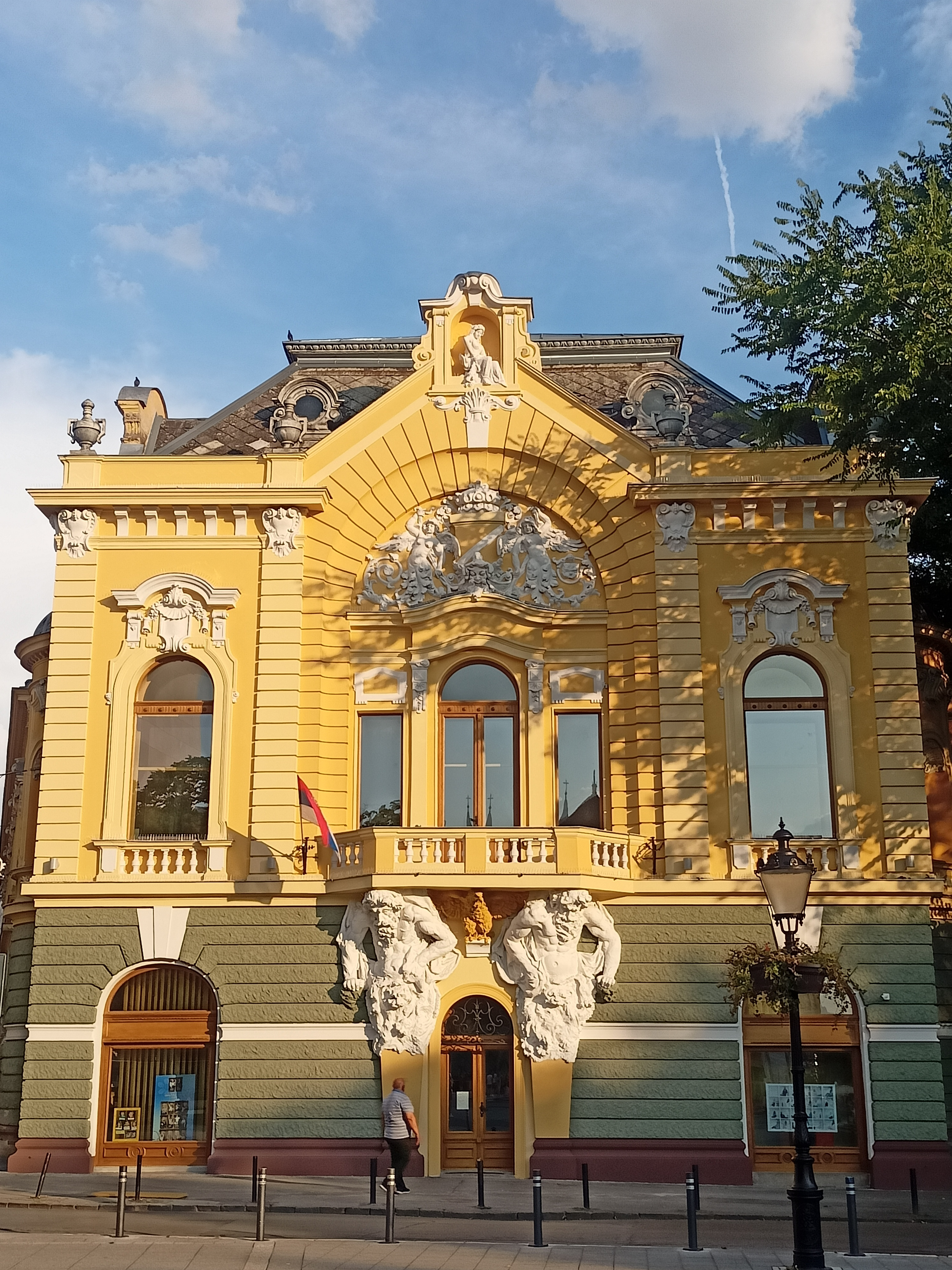
City Library by Feren J. Raichle in Subotica, 1896

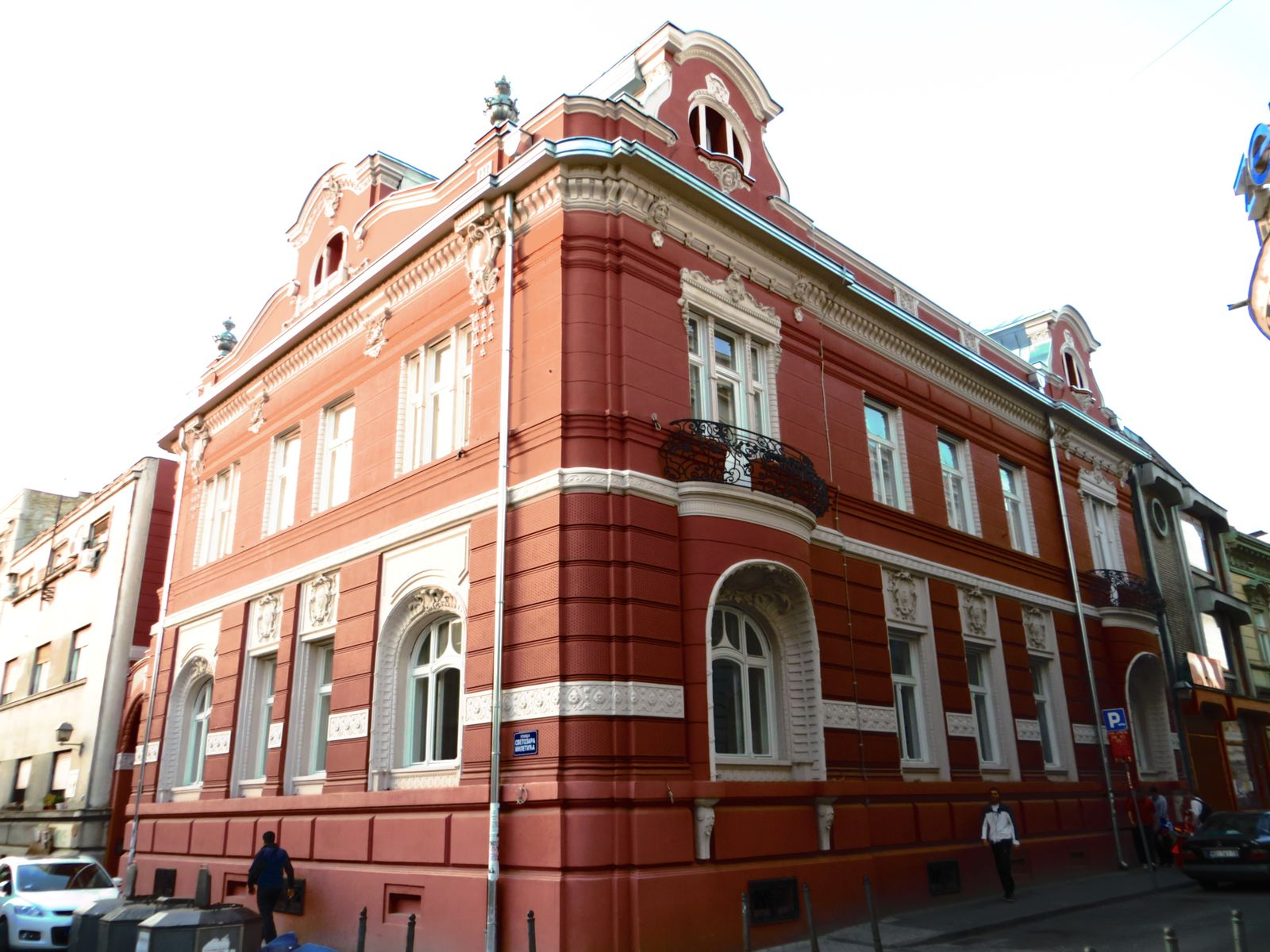
Town House of Jaša Dunđerski in Novi Sad

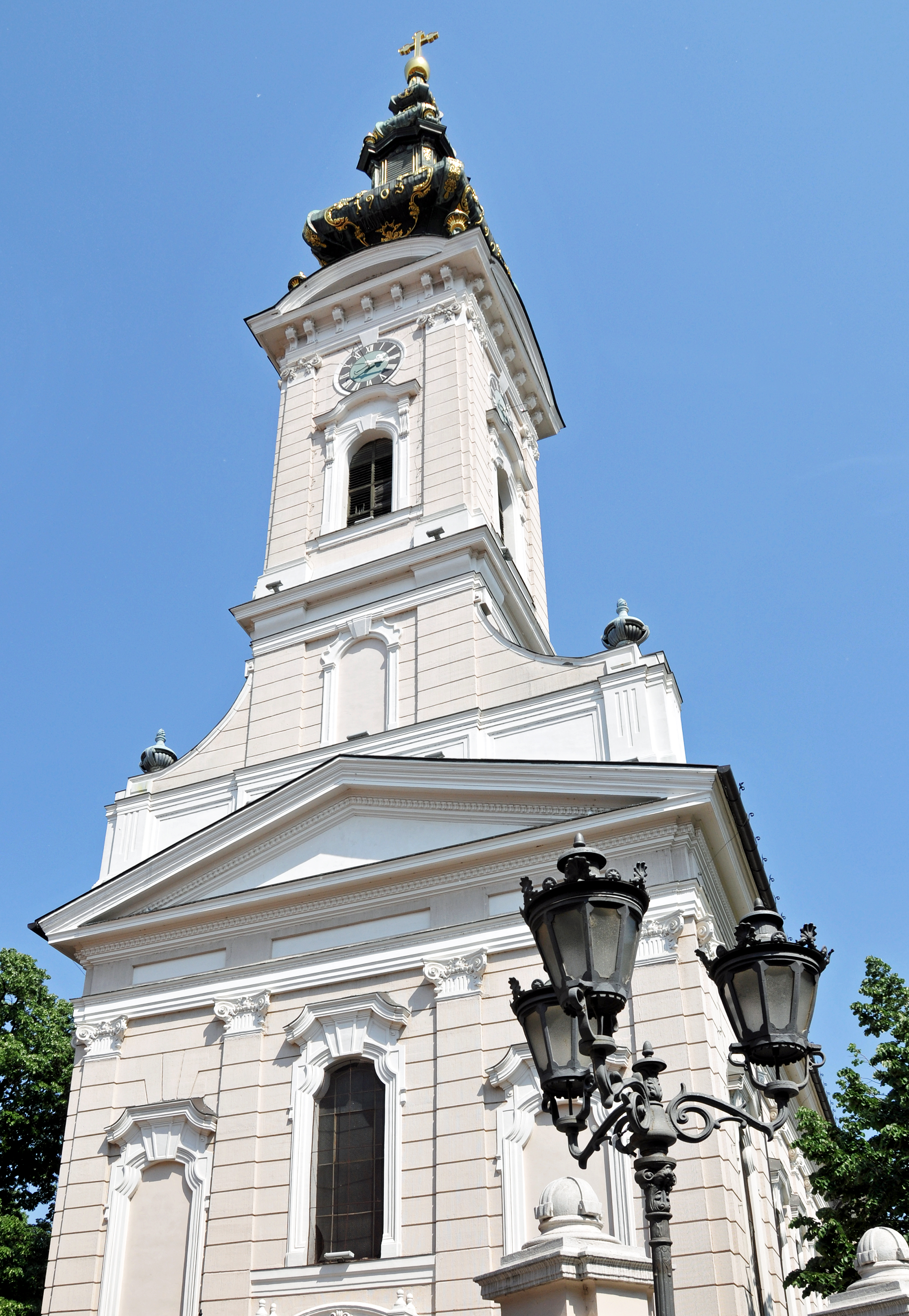
Orthodox Cathedral of St. George by Milan Michal Harminc in Novi Sad, 1905

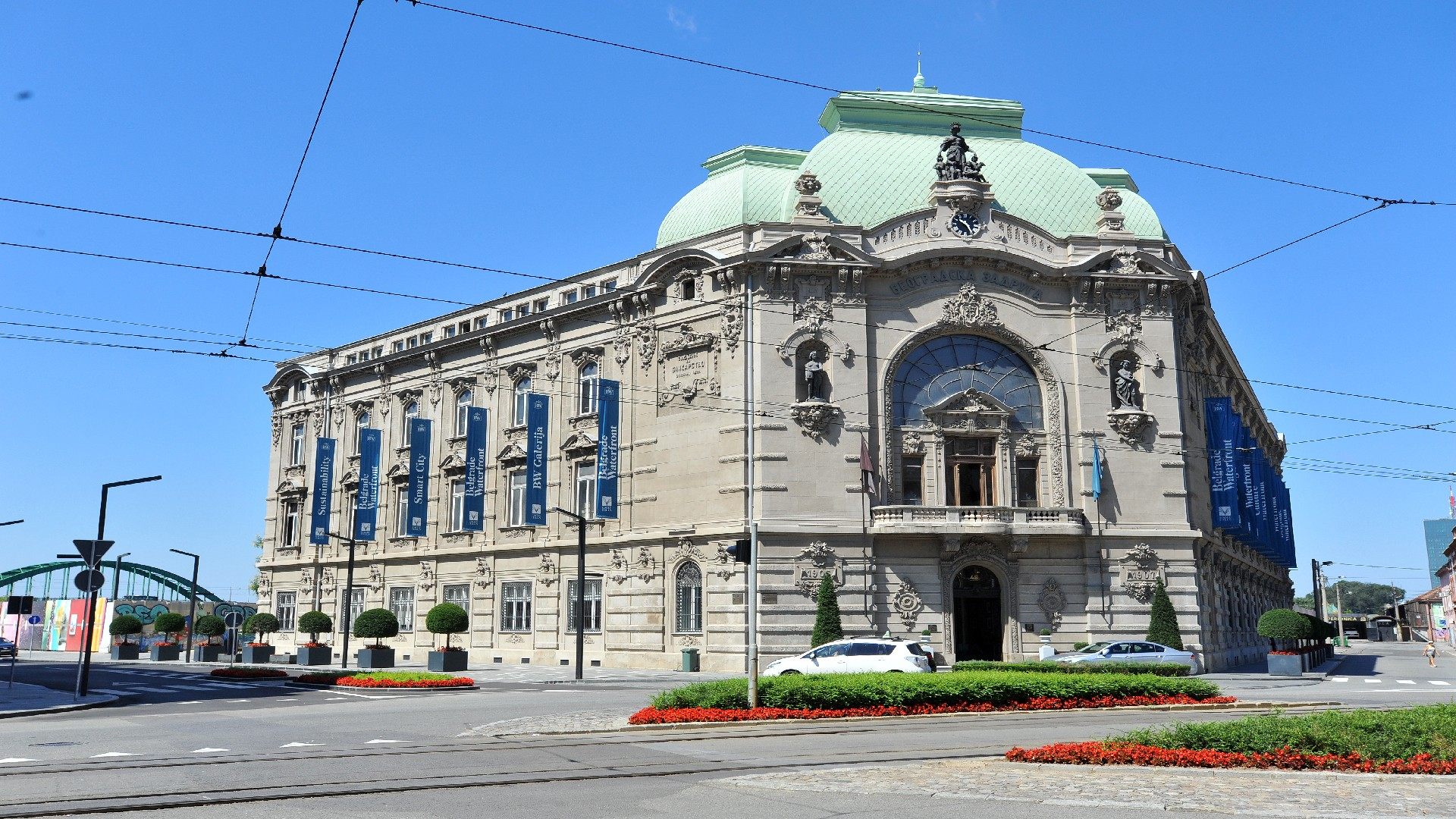
Belgrade Cooperative by Andra Stevanović and Nikola Nestorović, 1907

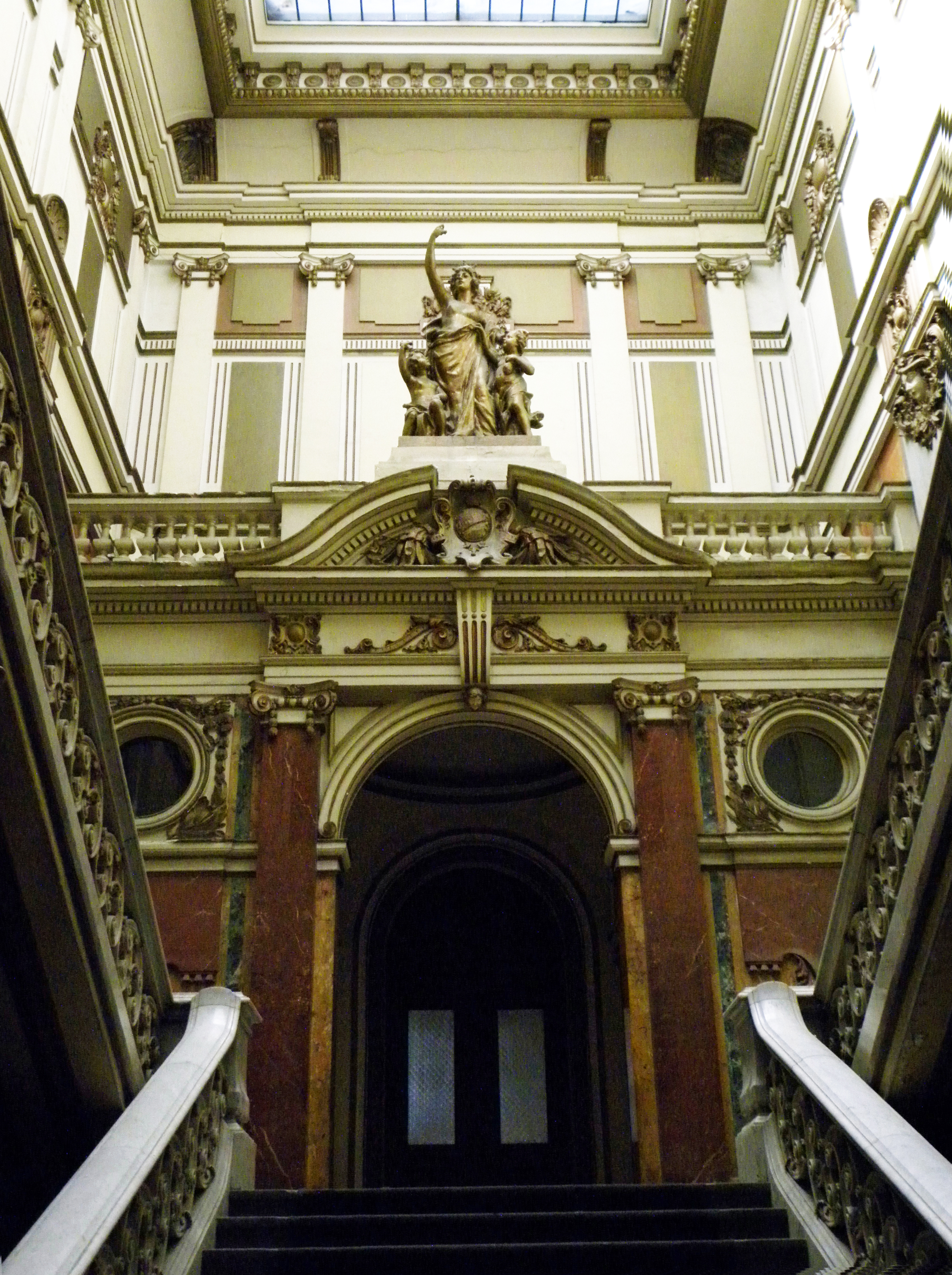
Interior of Belgrade Cooperative, 1907

==== Romanticism and Byzantine Revival ====
Neo-romanticism was mostly inspired by French and Hungarian architecture of the time. It would develop in parallel with Serbia's own national romanticism revival movement, often blending the two revival movements.

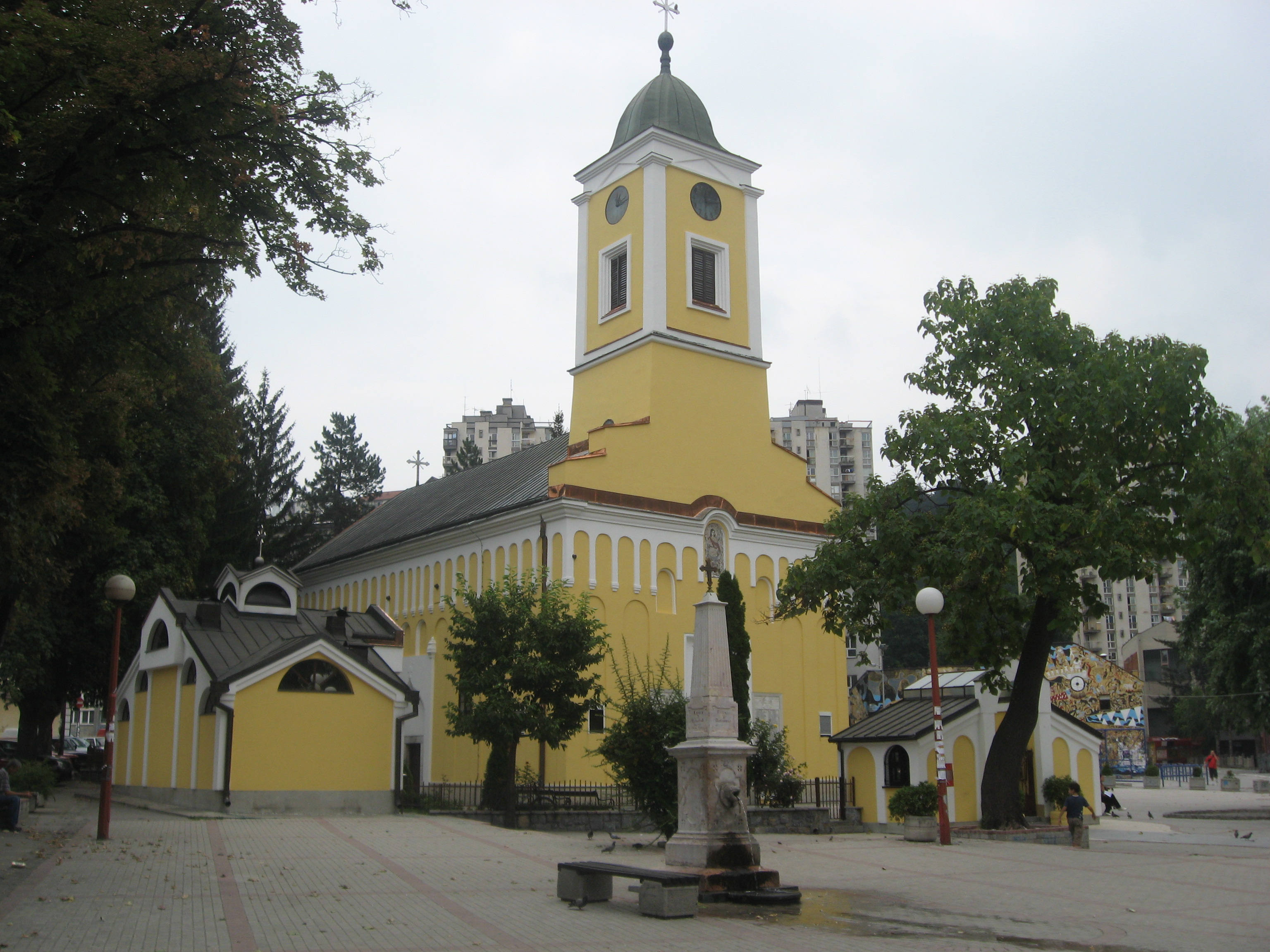
Orthodox Church of St. George by Jan Nevole in Užice, 1844

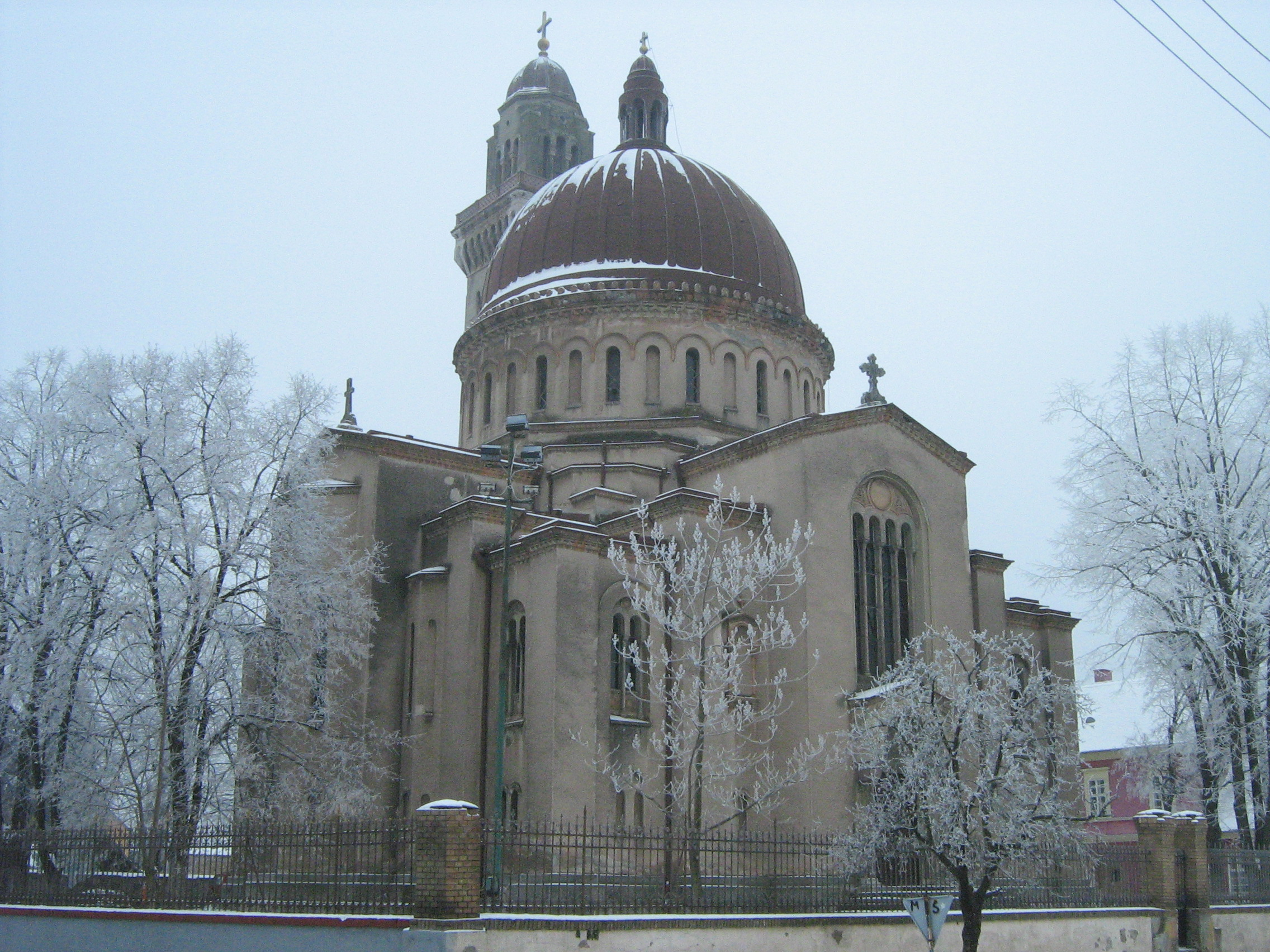
Orthodox Church of Holy Transfiguration by Svetozar Ivačković in Pančevo, 1878

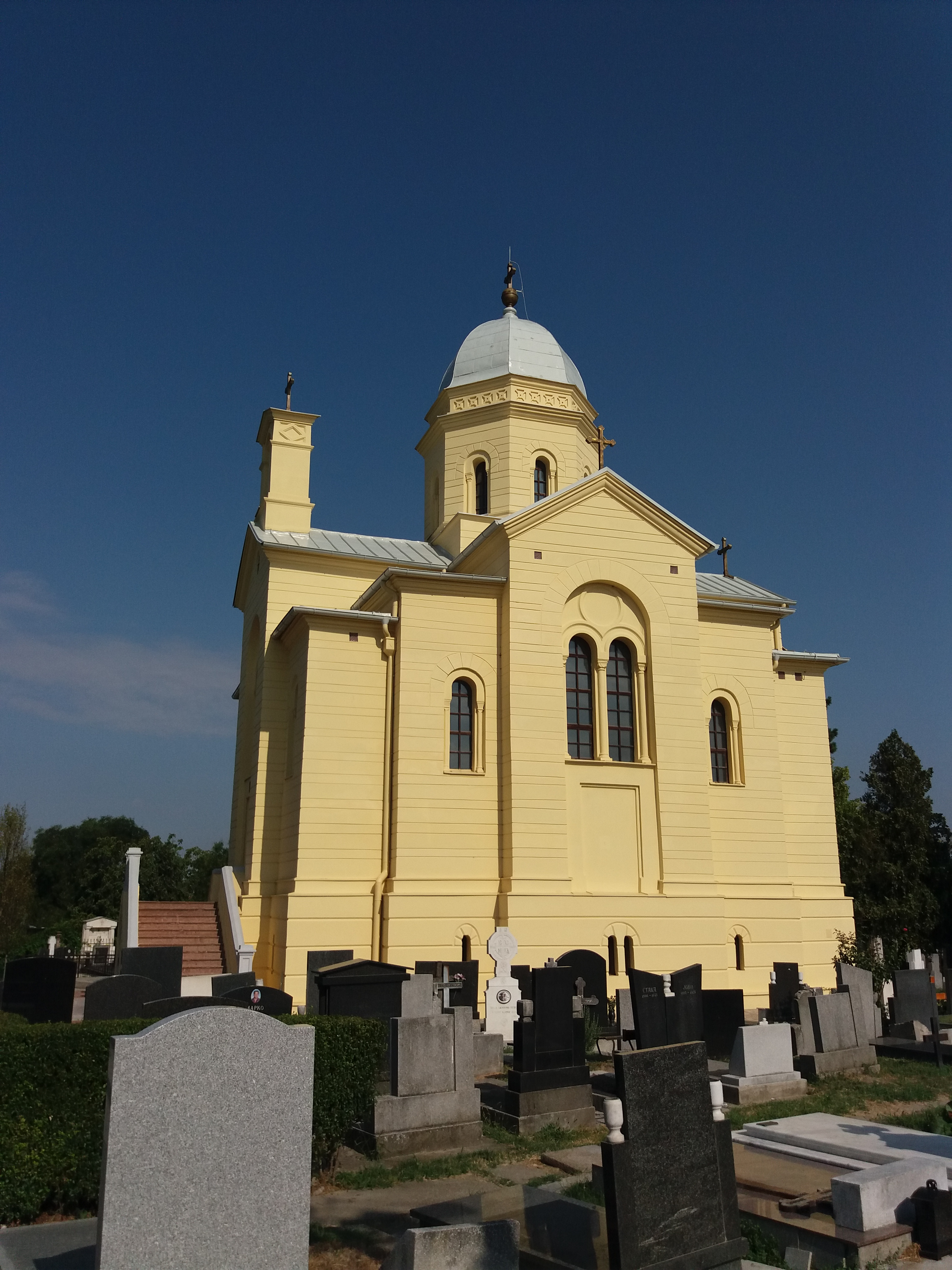
Church of St. Demetrius by Svetozar Ivačković in Zemun, Belgrade, 1878

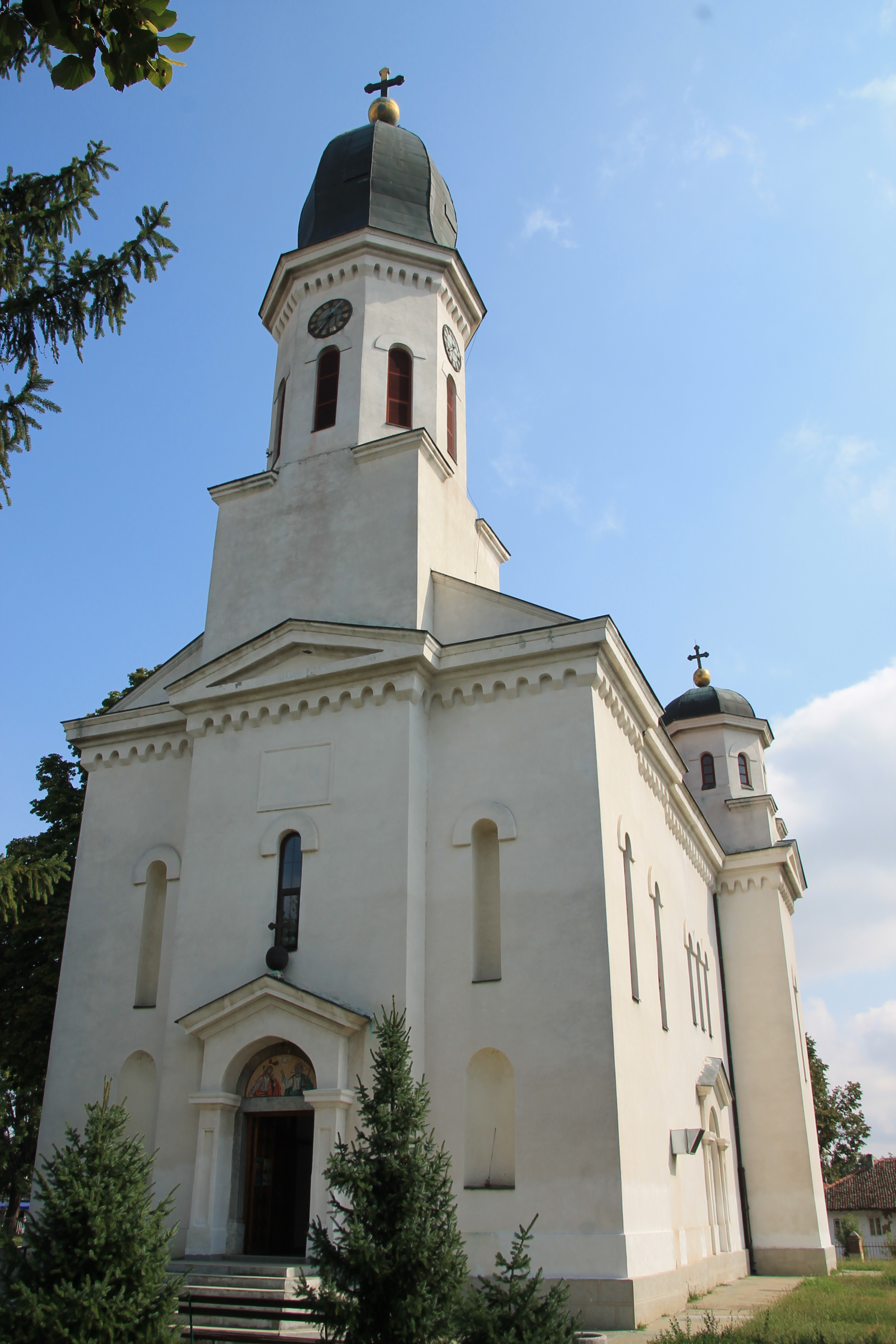
Orthodox Church of the Holy Trinity in Belgrade, 1883

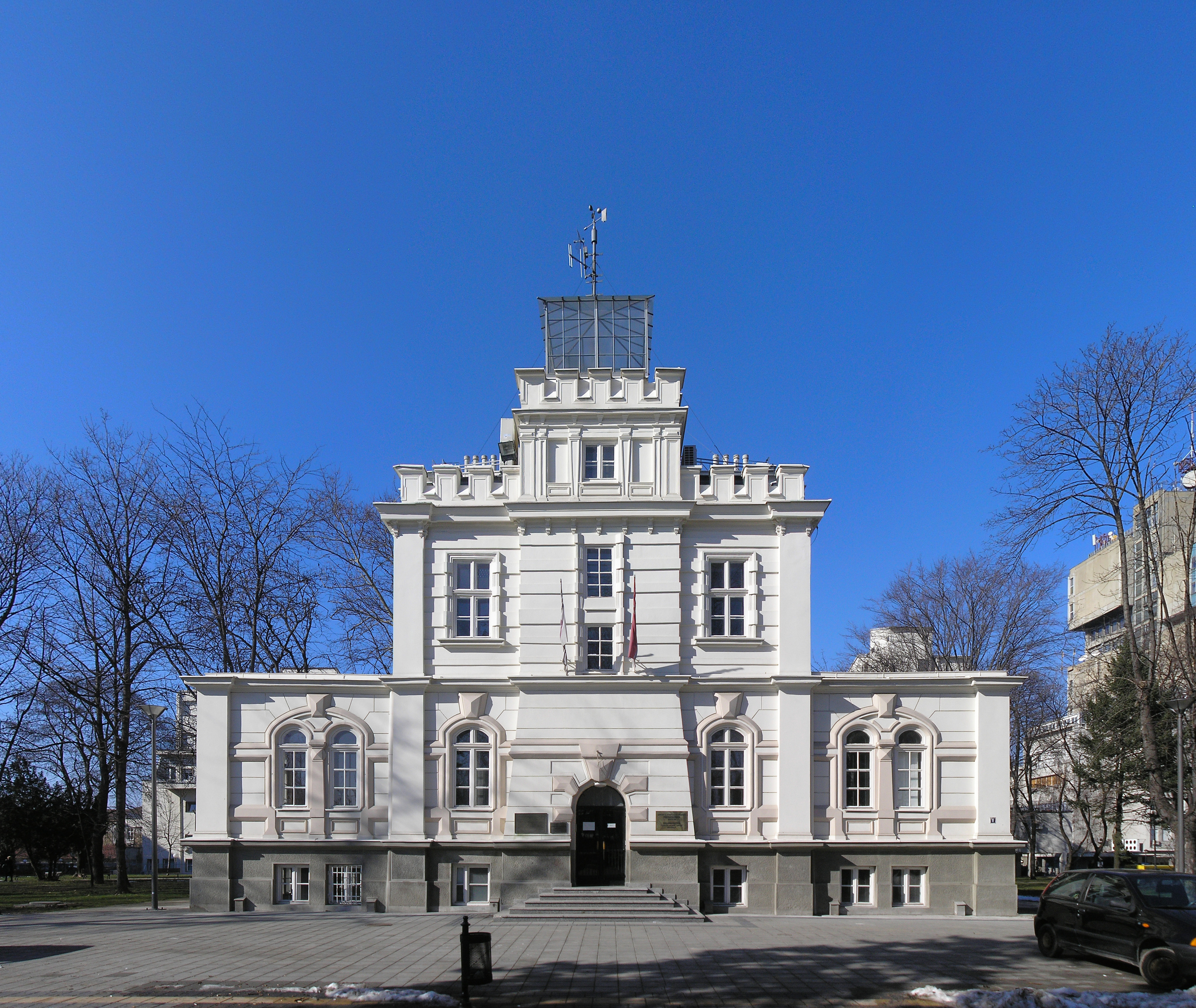
Astronomical and Meteorological Observatory of Belgrade University by Dimitrije T. Leko in Belgrade, 1891

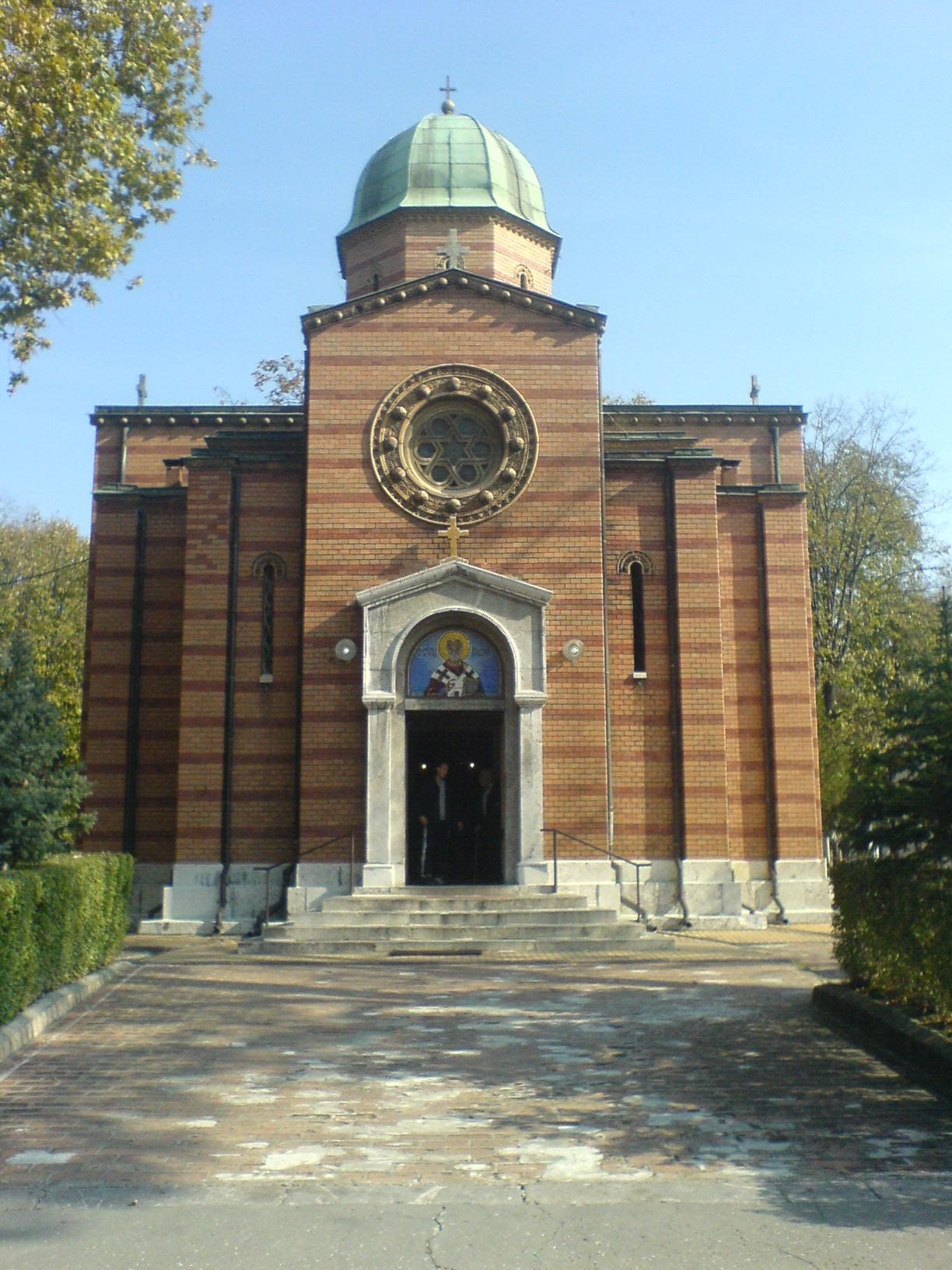
Orthodox Church of St. Nicholas by Svetozar Ivačković in Belgrade, 1893

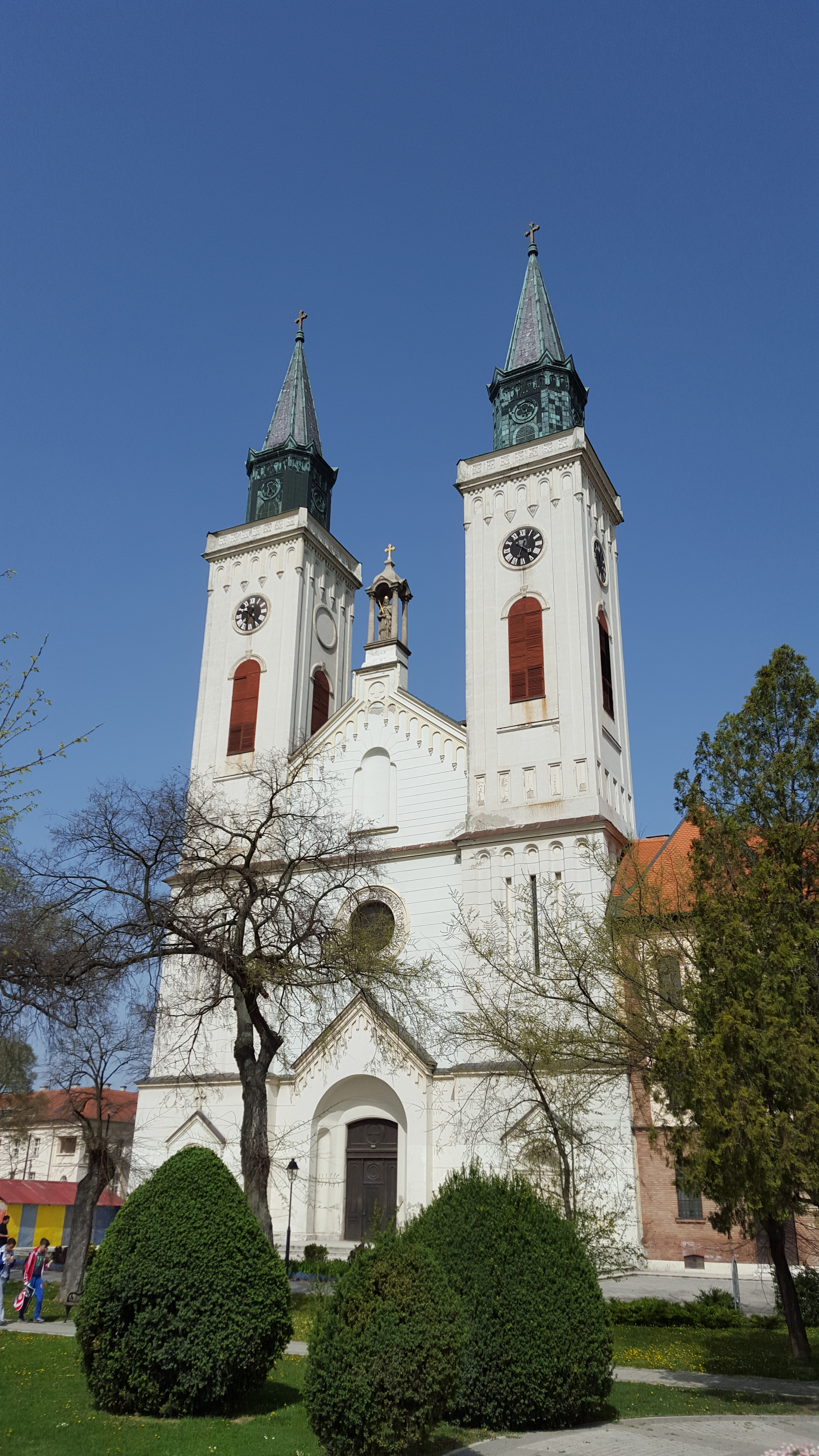
Catholic Church of St. Stephan (1904) and Carmelite Convent (1905) by Gyula Pártos in Sombor

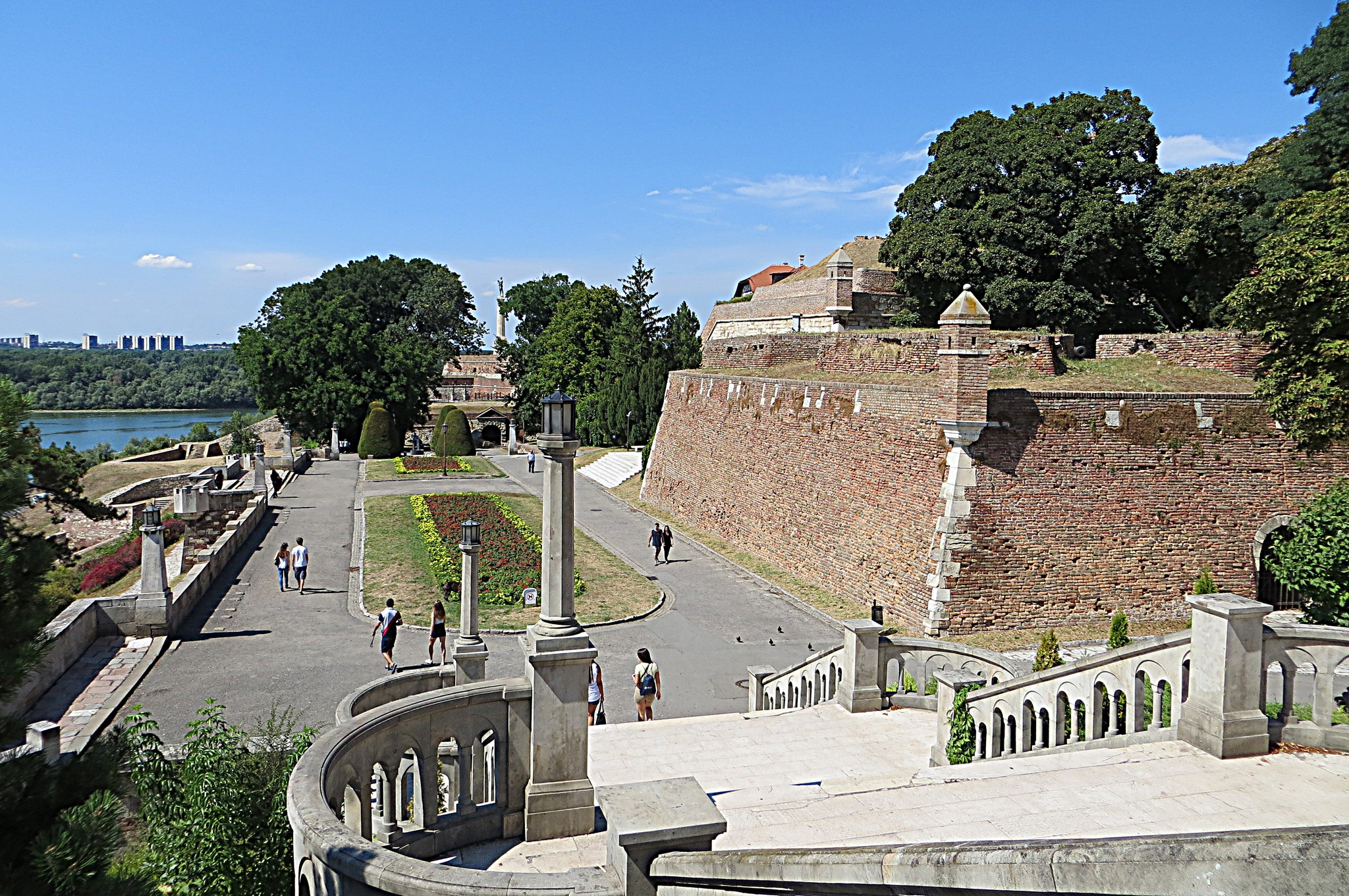
Big Staircase in Kalemegdan Park in Belgrade, 1928

==== Serbo-Byzantine Revival ====
The 19th century was a time of development of Serbian nationalism, which sought to develop a "national style" in architecture too, in line with national romanticism ideas. Within the broader movement of historicism, in parallel to neoclassical architecture, Serbia saw the development in particular of a Byzantine Revival architecture style.

Prior to the Exposition Universelle of 1889 and especially the Exposition Universelle of 1900, the Byzantine Revival movement in Serbia did not have a solidified national style, often taking Byzantine design elements interpreted through neo-romanticism styled façades and spires, with few examples of truly national revival architecture (St. Mark's Church, Belgrade and House of Vuk's Foundation). The Exposition in Paris was one of the key moments in developing and solidifying the Serbo-Byzantine Revival style (both internally and internationally), as the newly formed Serbian Paris Exhibition Committee brought together distinguished professors and experts from various fields that would contribute in summarizing the rich history of Serbia through the items and architecture presented at the Expo. With a prominent location at the bank of the Seine River near the Pont de l'Alma at the end of the Rue des Nations, Serbia introduced itself through a pavilion that looked like a church (almost looking like the Church of St. Mark in Belgrade) or a medieval Serbian Orthodox monastery (similar to Gračanica Monastery). The project's chief architect was Milan Kapetanović of Belgrade, in co-operation with architect Milorad Ruvidić. It was an ideological collection of national myths, depictions of pre-Christian supremacy, a journey into the past, and the celebration of pre-Ottoman roots. Serbia would come out of the Expo with international praises and accolades, reinvigorating its national consciousness, which was evident through the vibrant unique architecture built in Serbia after the Expo. The Serbo-Byzantine Revival style would be showcased at several Expos prior to the creation of the Kingdom of Serbs, Croats and Slovenes, such as the Liège International of 1905 and Turin International of 1911. There were plans to showcase Byzantine Revival architecture by a sibling architect duo of Petar and Branko Krstić at the Sesquicentennial Exposition of 1926, but due to disagreements between Belgrade and Zagreb cultural scenes, the Expo pavilion was never built.

Serbia's modern sacral architecture got its main impetus from the dynastic burial church in Oplenac which was commissioned by member of the Karađorđević dynasty in 1909. With the arrival of Russian émigré artist after the October Revolution, Belgrade's main governmental edifices were planned by eminent Russian architects trained in Russian Empire. It was King Aleksandar I. who was the patron of the neobyzantine movement. Its main proponents were Aleksandar Deroko, Momir Korunović, Branko Krstić, Petar Krstić, Grigorijji Samojlov and Nikolay Krasnov. Their main contribution were Beli dvor, the Church of Saint Sava, St. Mark's Church, Belgrade. After the communist era ended Mihailo Mitrović and Nebojša Popović were proponents of new tendencies in sacral architecture which used classic examples in the Byzantine tradition. The style would even incorporate elements of Art Nouveau and Secession with national motifs.

Serbo-Byzantine Revival is still prevalent in contemporary Serbia, especially with religious buildings such as churches and monasteries. The Church of Saint Sava is the best example of contemporary Serbo-Byzantine Revival architecture, being inspired by Hagia Sophia in Istanbul.

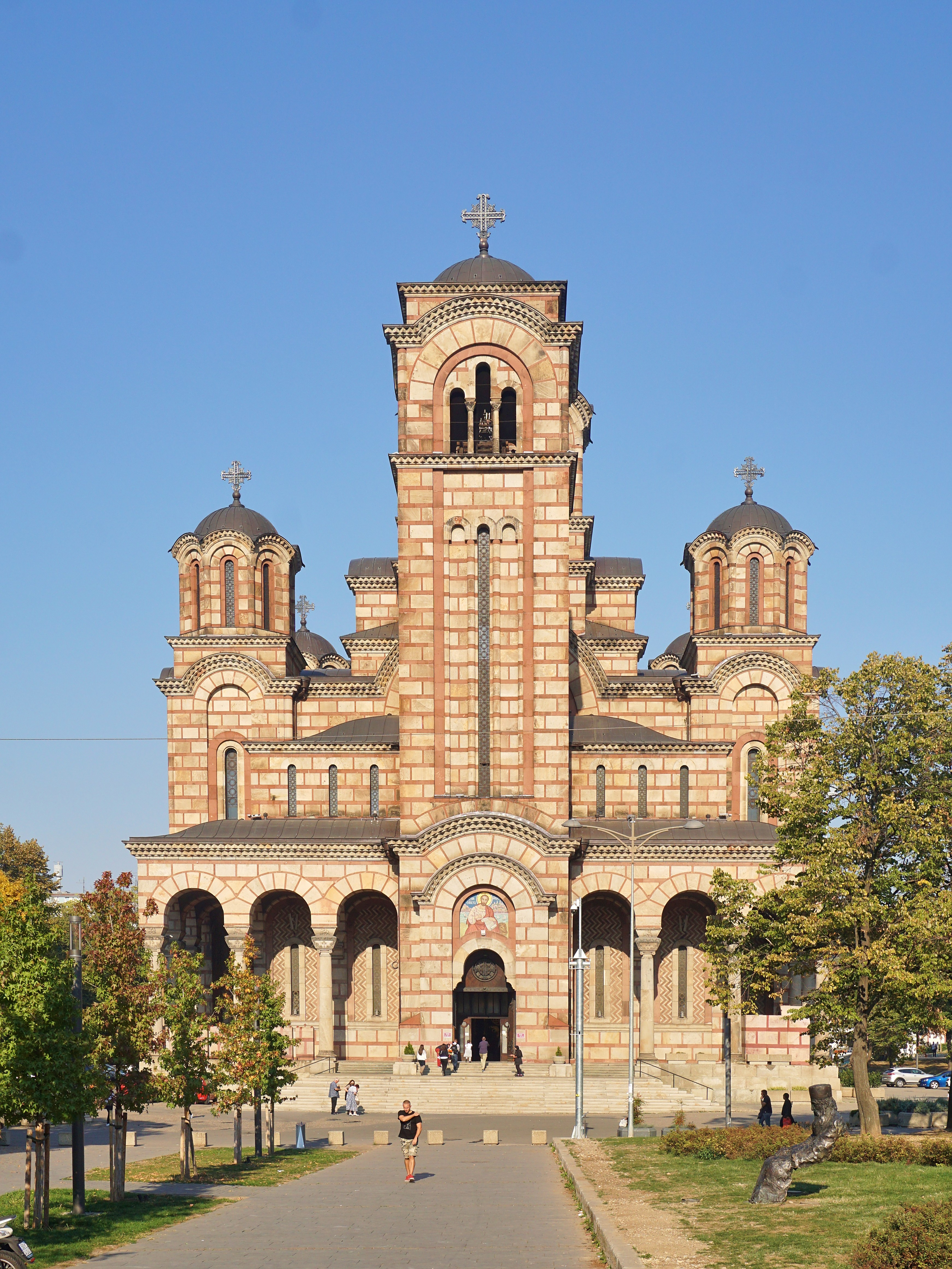
St. Mark's Church, Belgrade in Belgrade, 1835

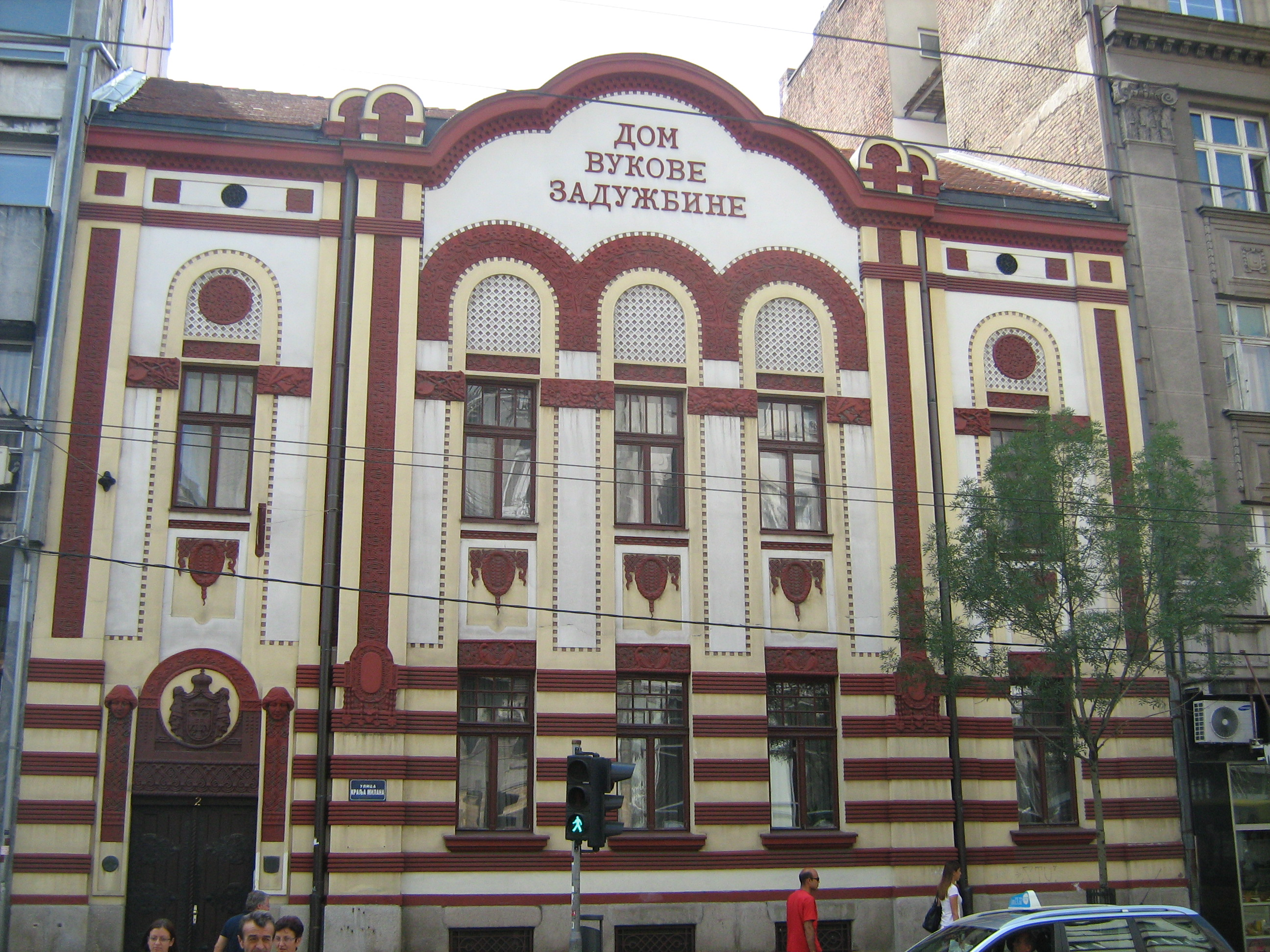
House of Vuk's Foundation by Branko Tanazević in Belgrade, 1879

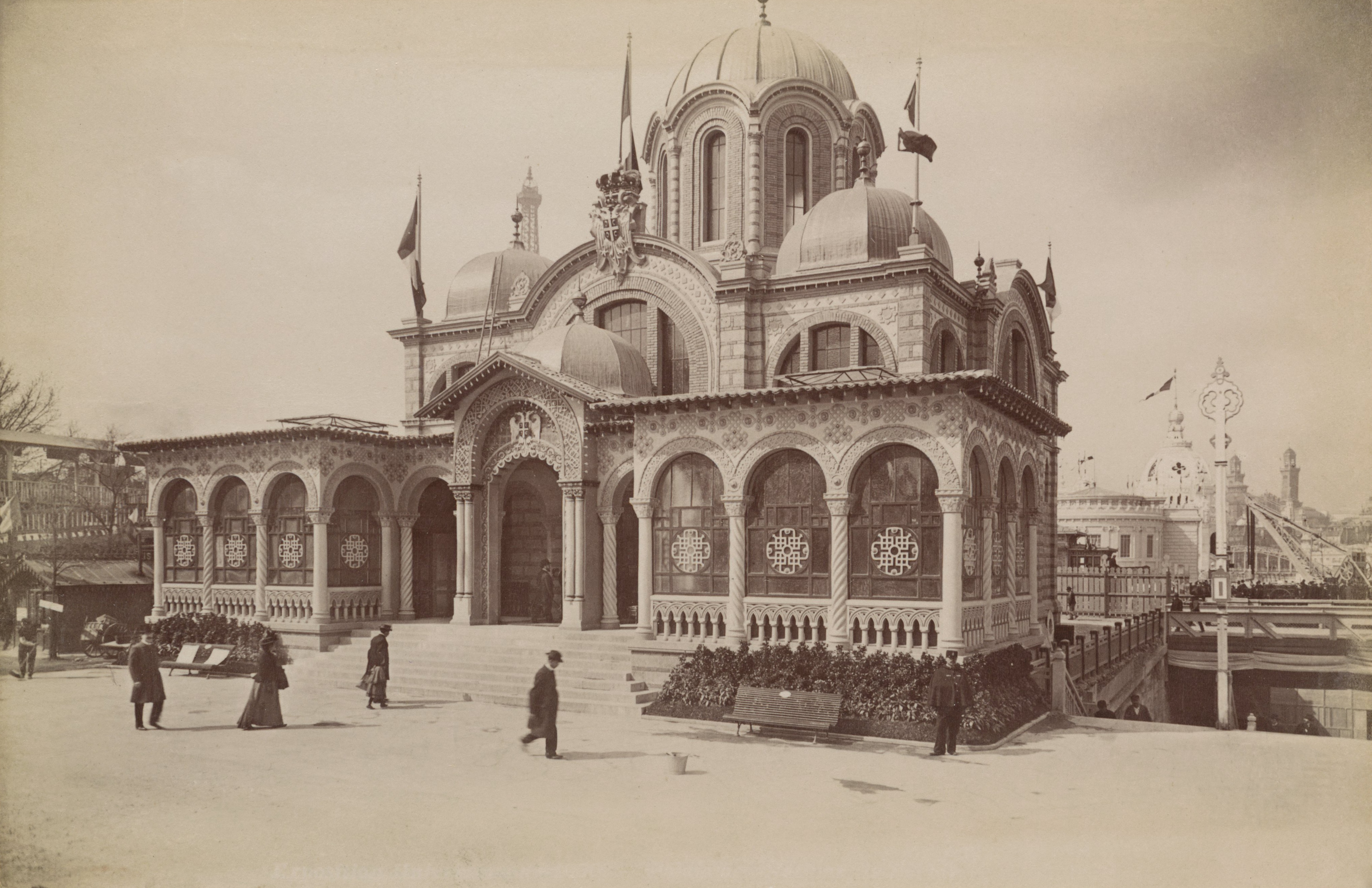
Pavilion of Serbia at the Exposition Universelle by Milan Kapetanović and Milorad Ruvidić in Paris, 1900

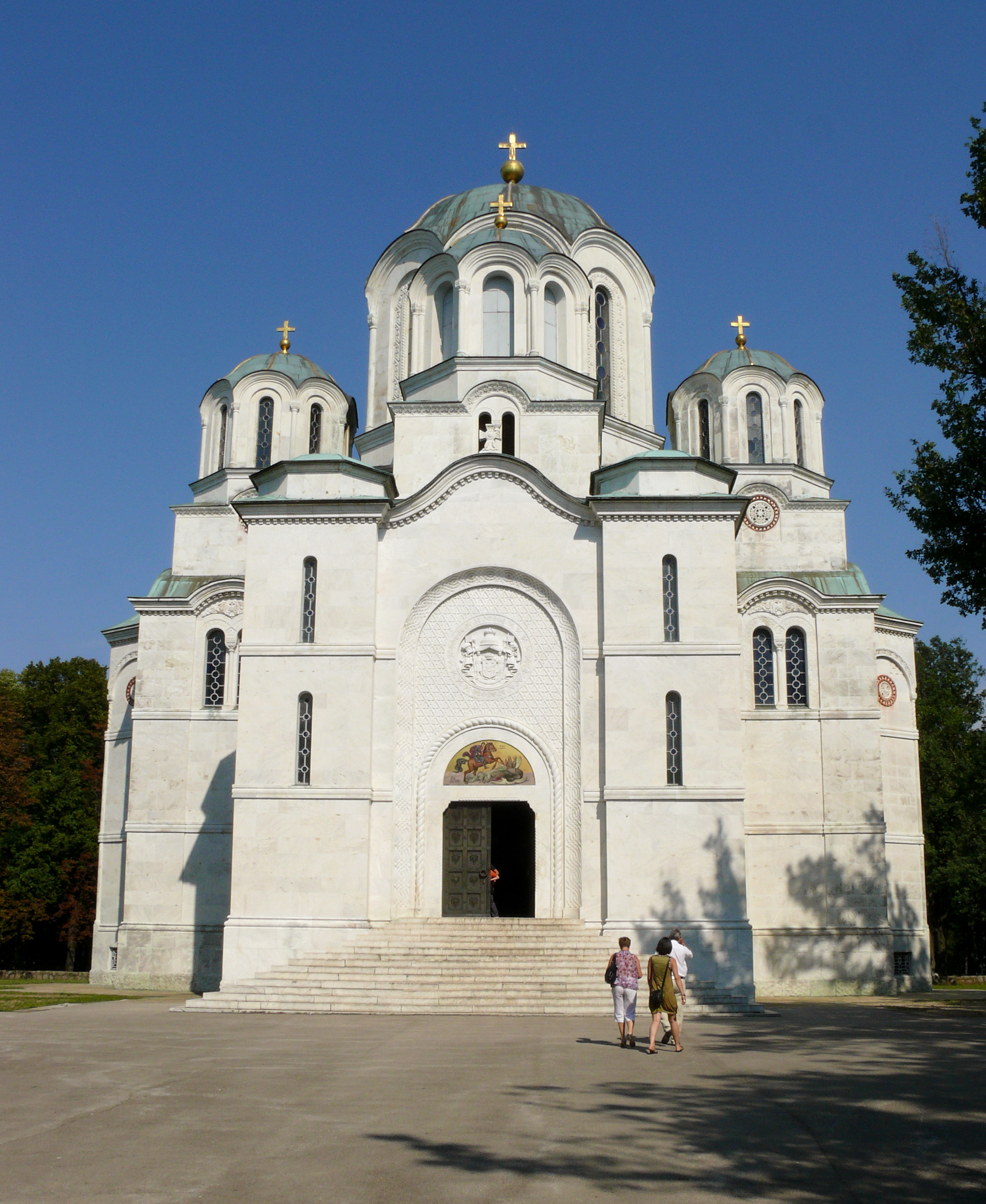
Orthodox Church of St. George by Konstantin Jovanović in Topola, 1910

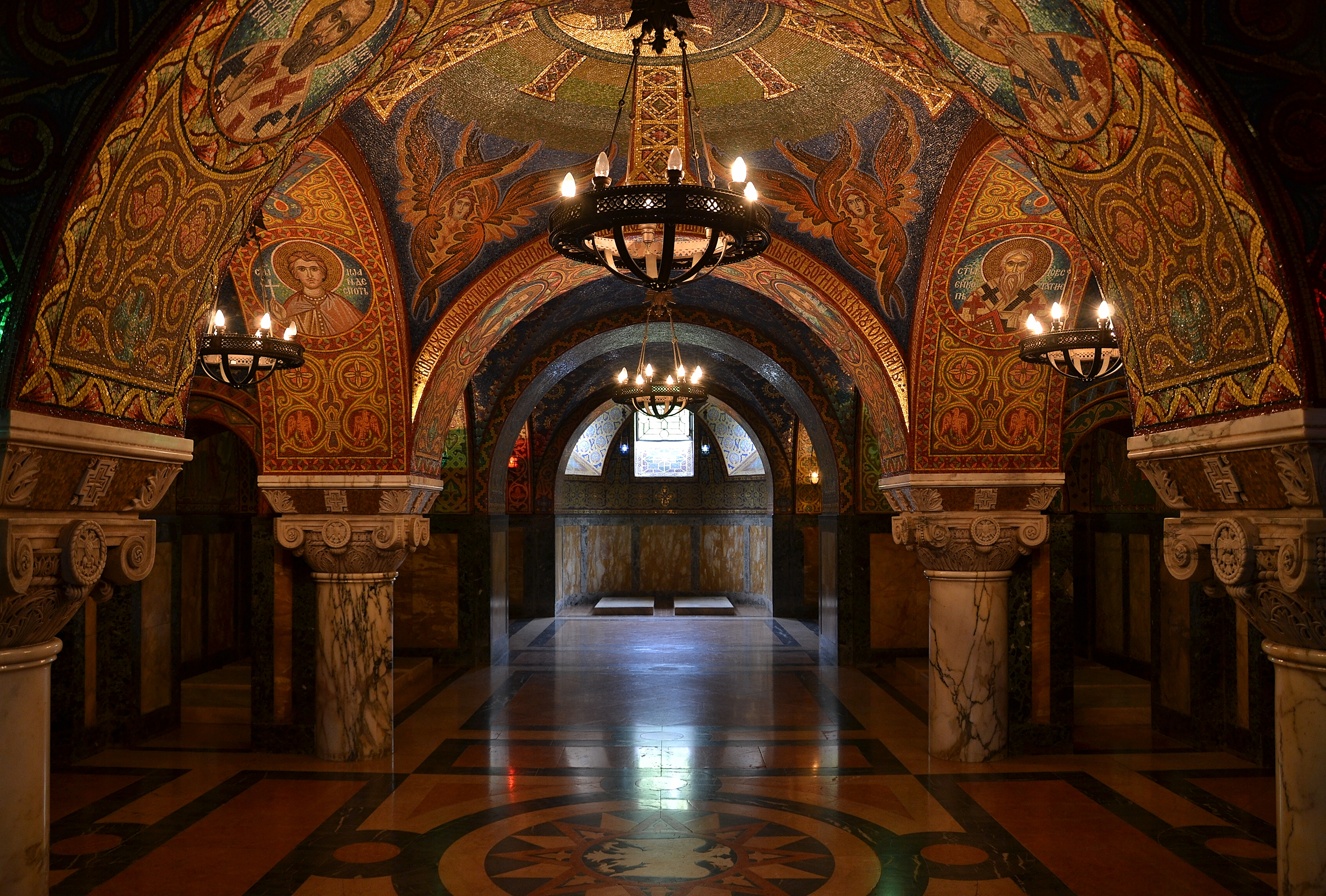
Crypt of Oplenac mausoleum by Nikolay Krasnov, 1910

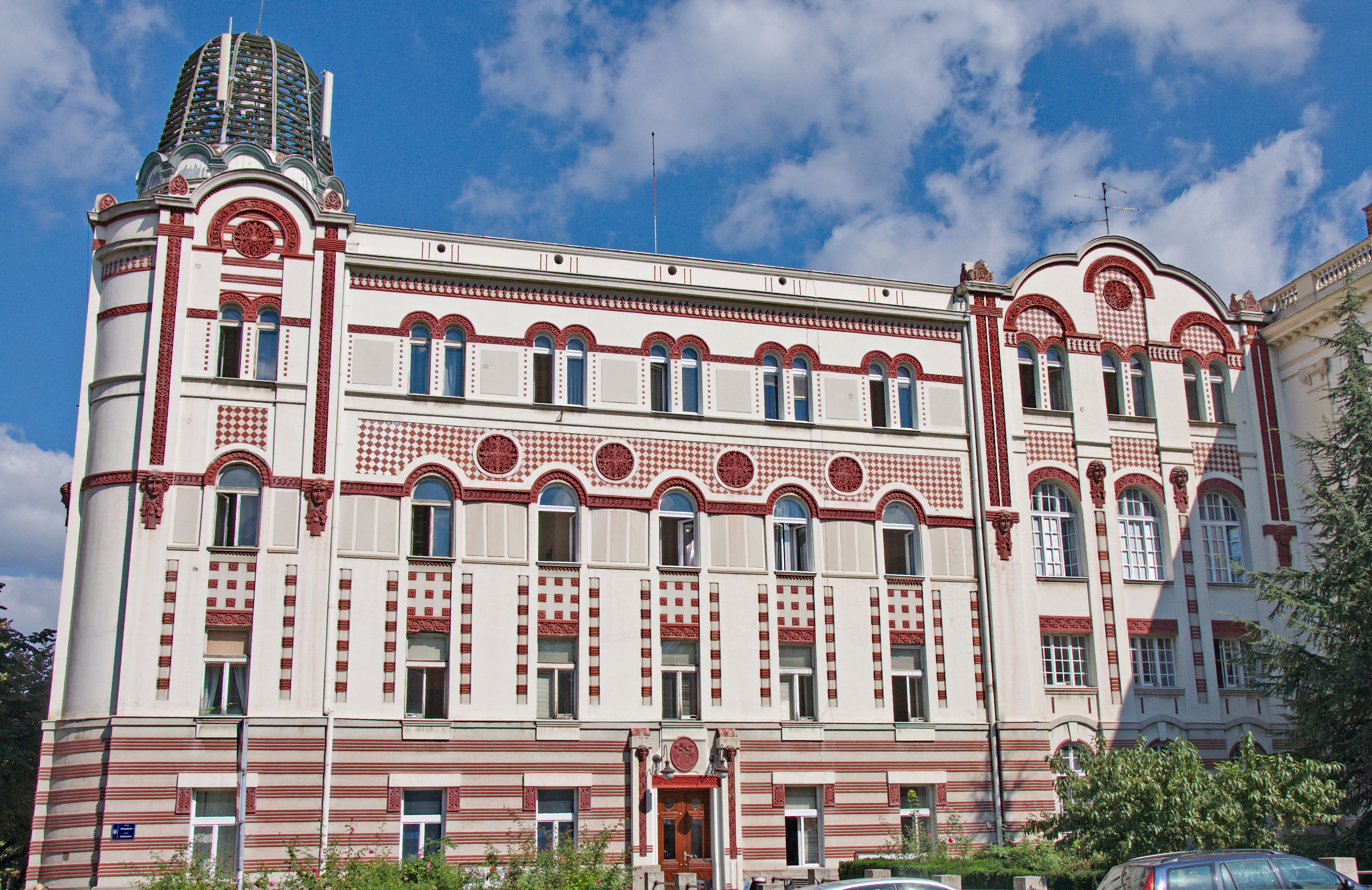
Old telephone exchange by Branko Tanazević in Belgrade, 1923

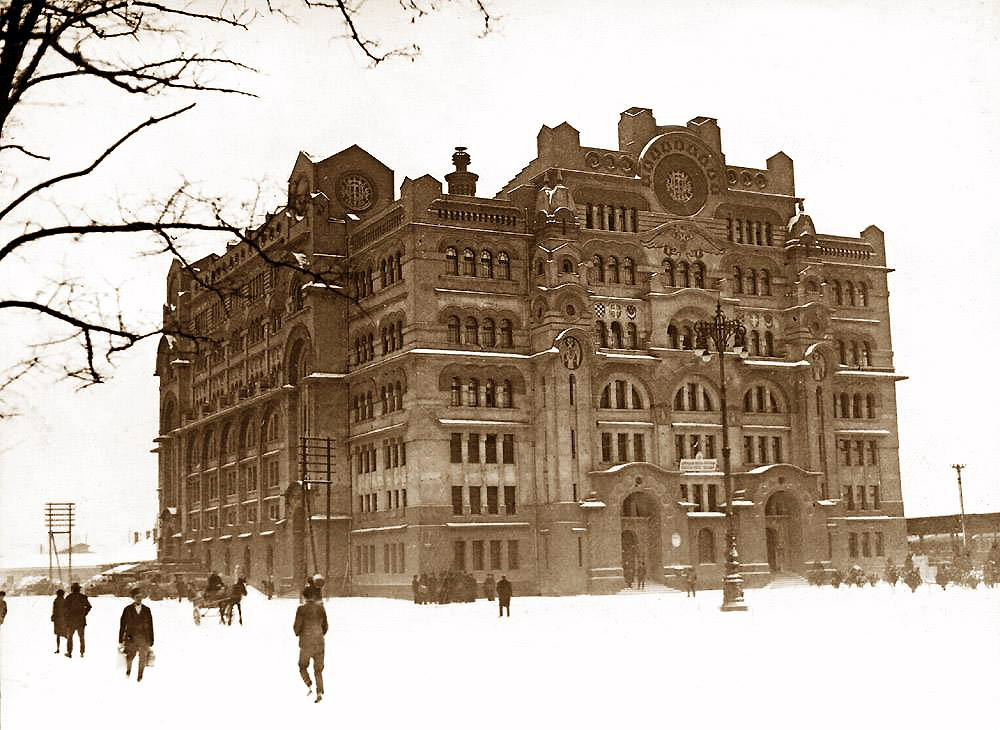
Old Post Office by Momir Korunović in Belgrade, 1929

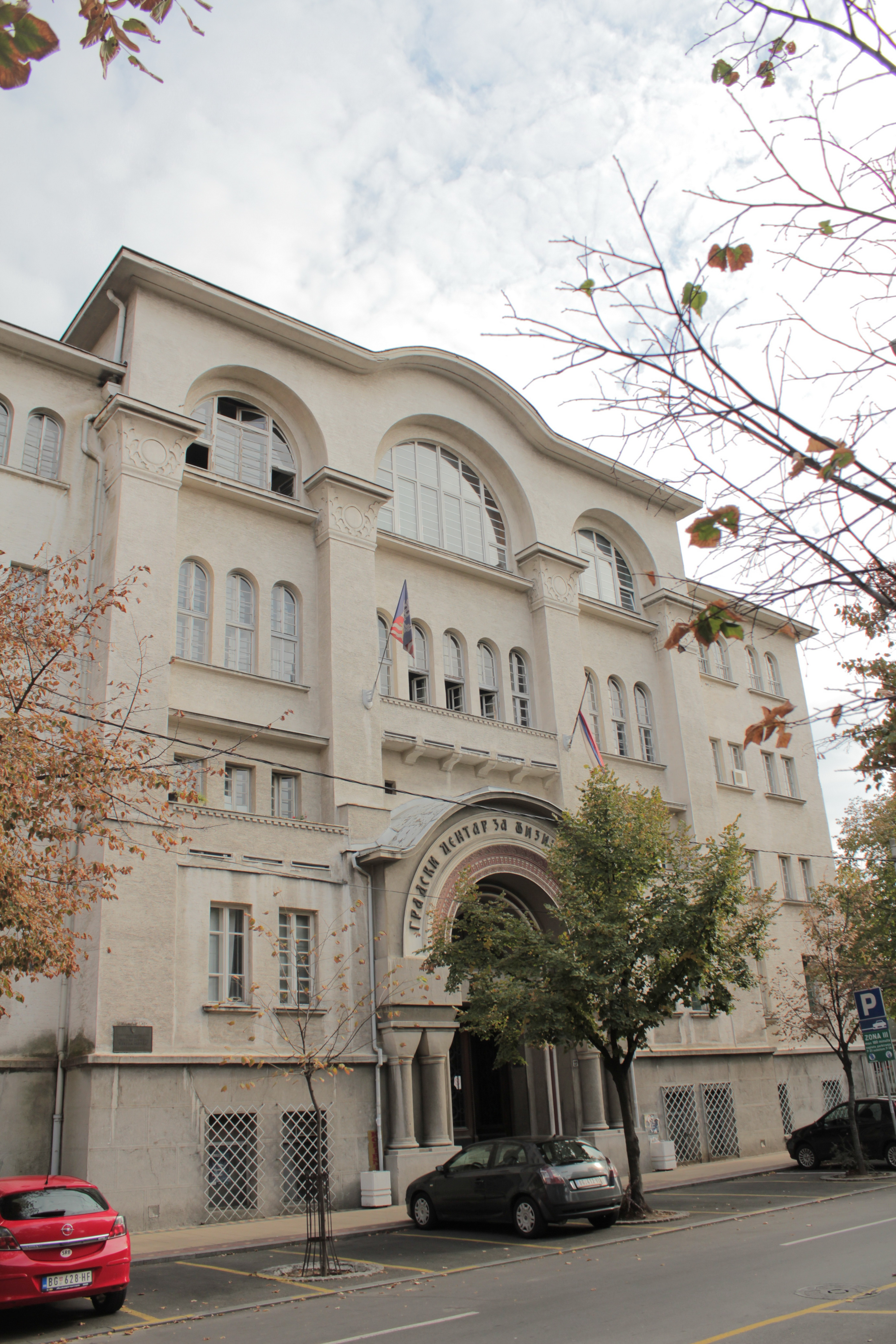
Falconry building Matica by Momir Korunović in Belgrade, 1935

=== Art Nouveau and Secession Style ===
The Art Nouveau and Vienna Secession style flourished in Serbia, especially in the north of the country at the turn of the 20th century, when the Vojvodina region was still part of the Hungarian kingdom under the Habsburgs. Subotica hosts particularly remarkable buildings from the period, inspired by Hungarian Szecesszió. Other settlements such as Apatin, Aranđelovac, Belgrade, Horgoš, Kikinda, Niš, Novi Sad, Pančevo, Senta, Vrbas, Vrnjačka Banja, and Zrenjanin were not immune from the architectural novelty either.

During the first decade of the 20th century, more monumental, but also smaller, objects were built in Novi Sad, which we now classify as secessionist. The residential palaces of the Menrath, Winkler and Adamović families, then the new premises of Synagog, City Hospital, Iodine Spa, Hungarian Gymnasium (demolished to make way for the Mihajlo Pupin Boulevard) and a whole range of other buildings were created under the influence of the new style. These buildings fitted into the city's historic core, spread to still unbuilt plots of new streets, and were built in the years after the First World War, heralding the modern architecture of the 20th century. Thanks to the principles of secession, new materials have been introduced into the architecture (concrete, glass, forged iron, ceramics), functional residential and public spaces have been created, façades have been revived with imaginative constructive solutions and new decorative repertoire, and the urban matrix has acquired its present-day appearance. Most notable examples of secession architecture in Novi Sad are from the Vienna secession style done by Lipót Baumhorn, Károly Kovács and Bеlа Pаklо.

During Socialist Yugoslavia, secession buildings would have their façades altered with the inclusion of socialist and communist imagery. The City Hospital built in 1909 (known also as the Clinical Center of Vojvodina) had the coat of arms of Socialist Yugoslavia added to the main upper façades, which remained there until the 2022 restoration. Mihajlo Pupin secondary school of electrical engineering built in 1921 still showcases the coat of arms of Socialist Serbia on top of the front entrance, one of the rare remaining examples of socialist imagery on pre-existing architecture in Novi Sad.

- Novi Sad: Savings Bank Palace (1907), Novi Sad Synagogue (1909), Tomin's Palace (1909),
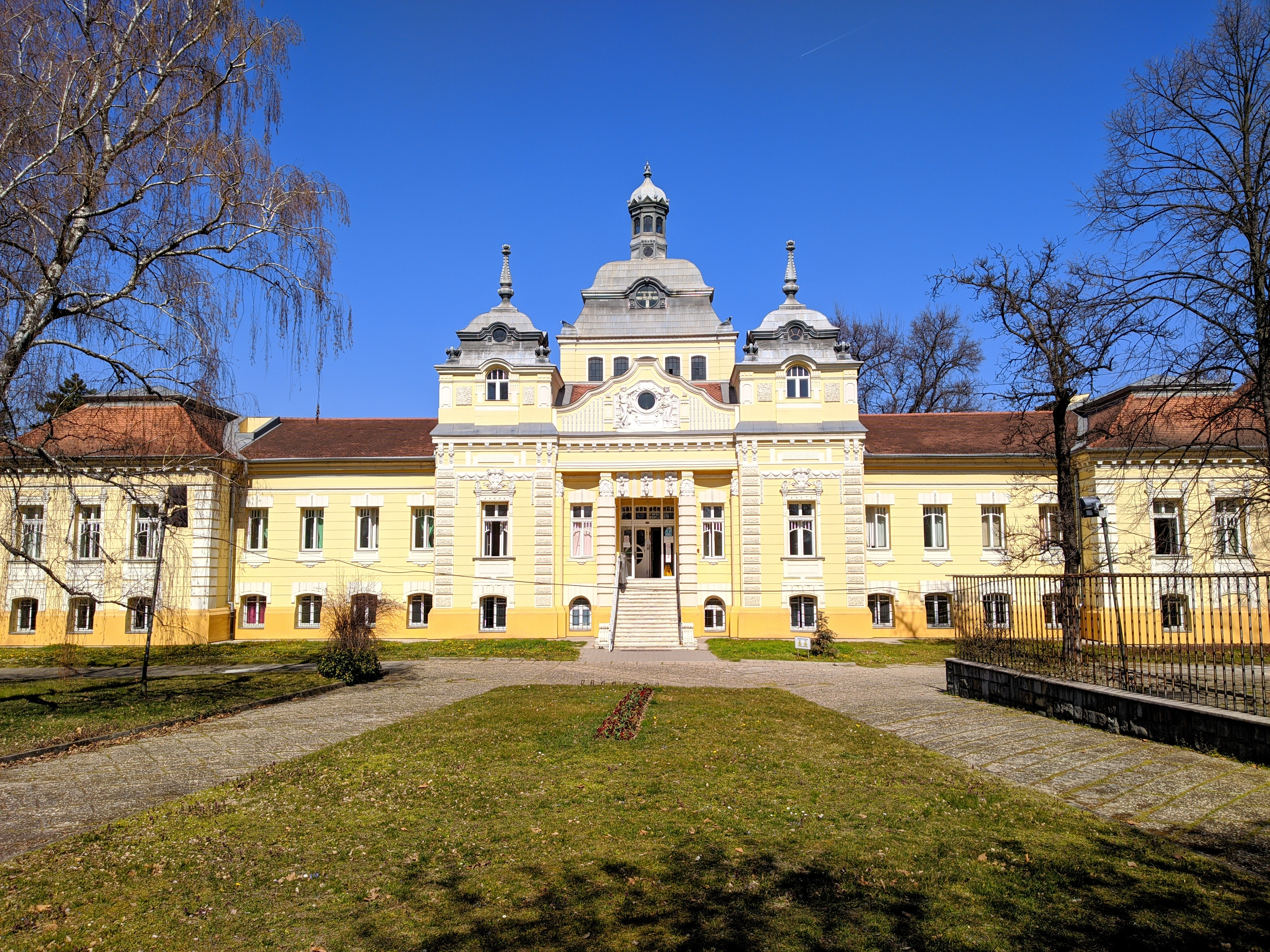
Iodine Spa by Imre Franček, 1897

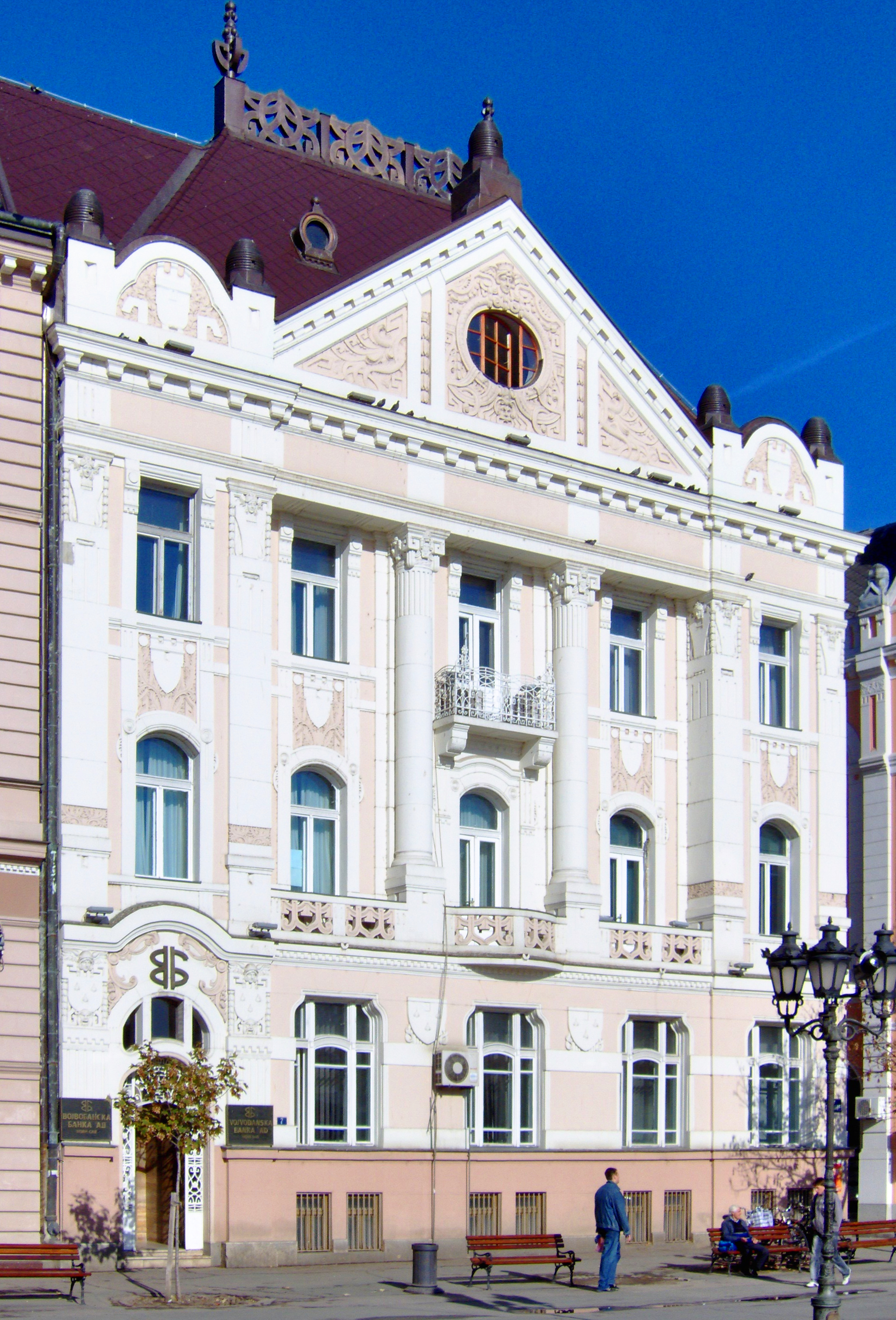
Savings Bank Palace by Lipót Baumhorn, 1905

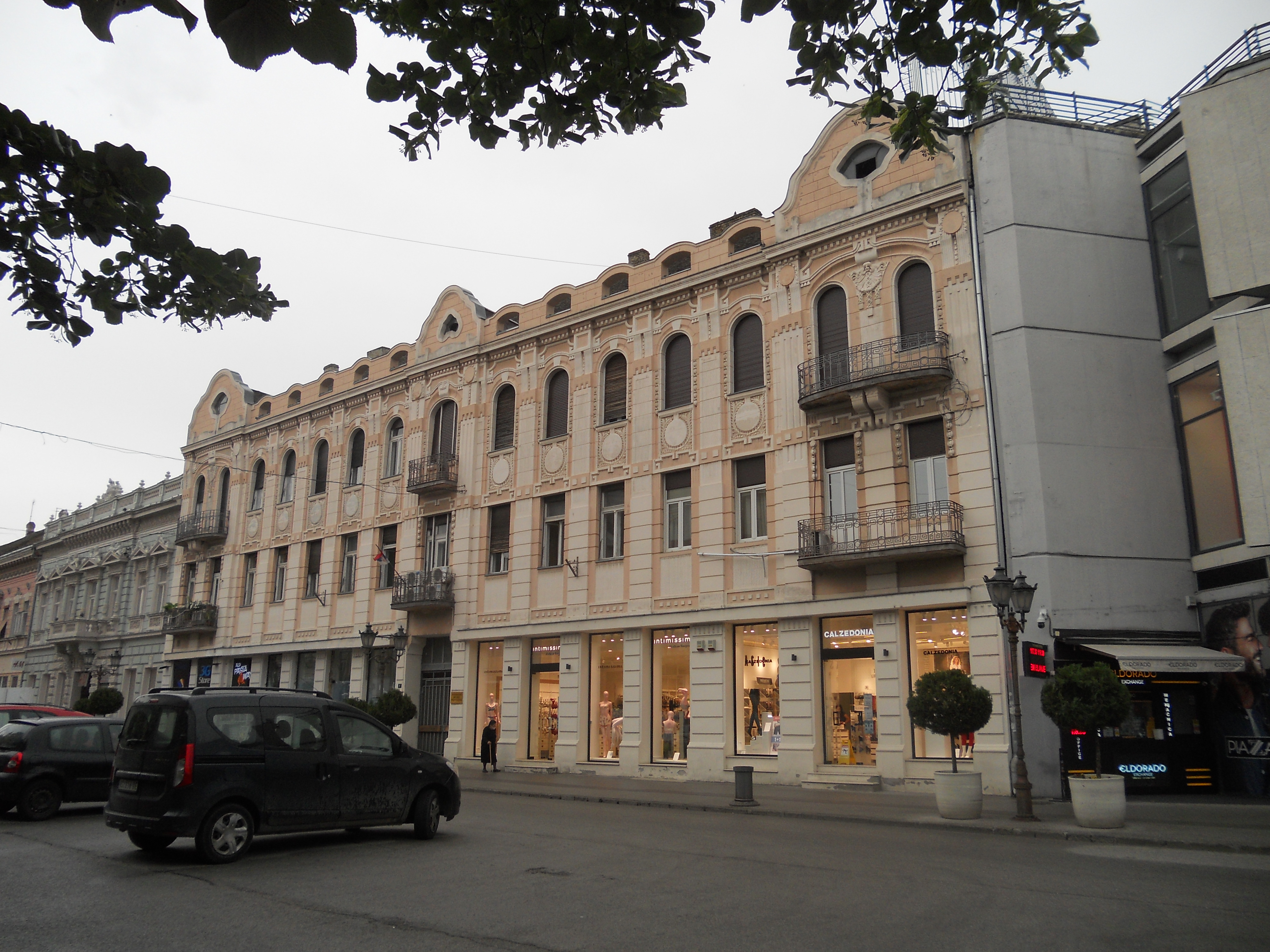
Winkler Family Palace by Károly Kovács, 1906/07

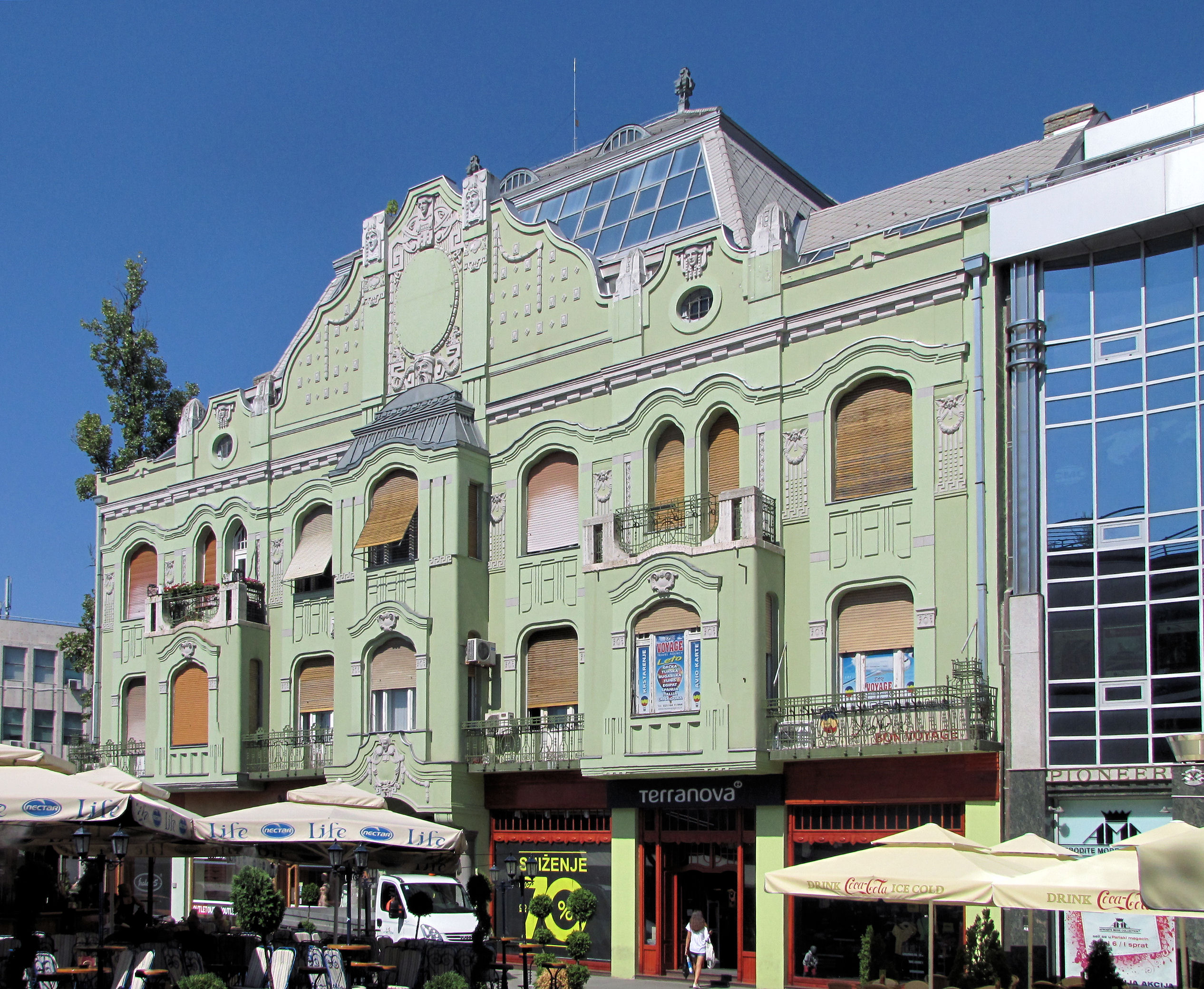
Menrath Family Palace by Lipót Baumhorn, 1908

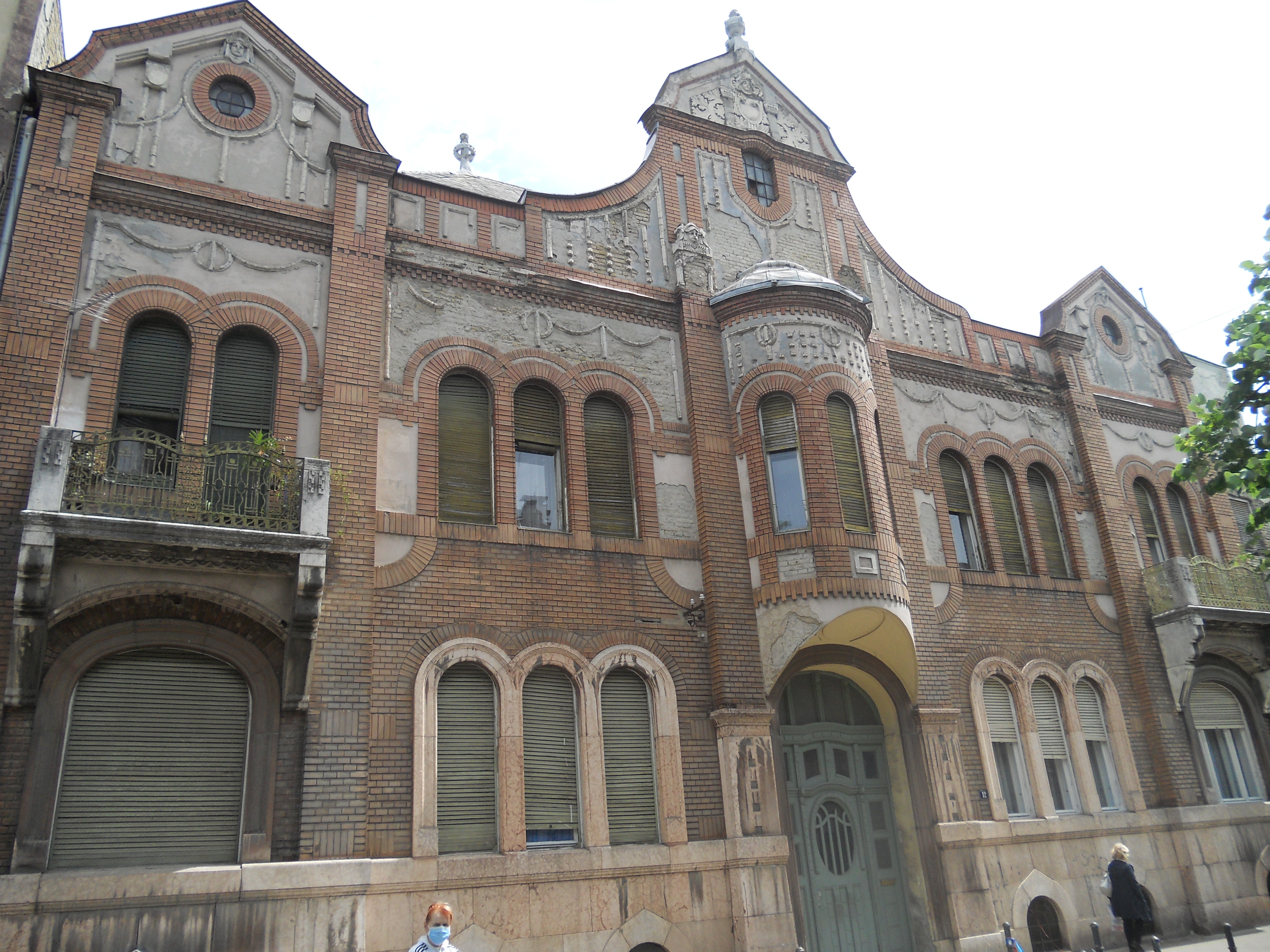
Tomin's Palace by Lipót Baumhorn, 1909

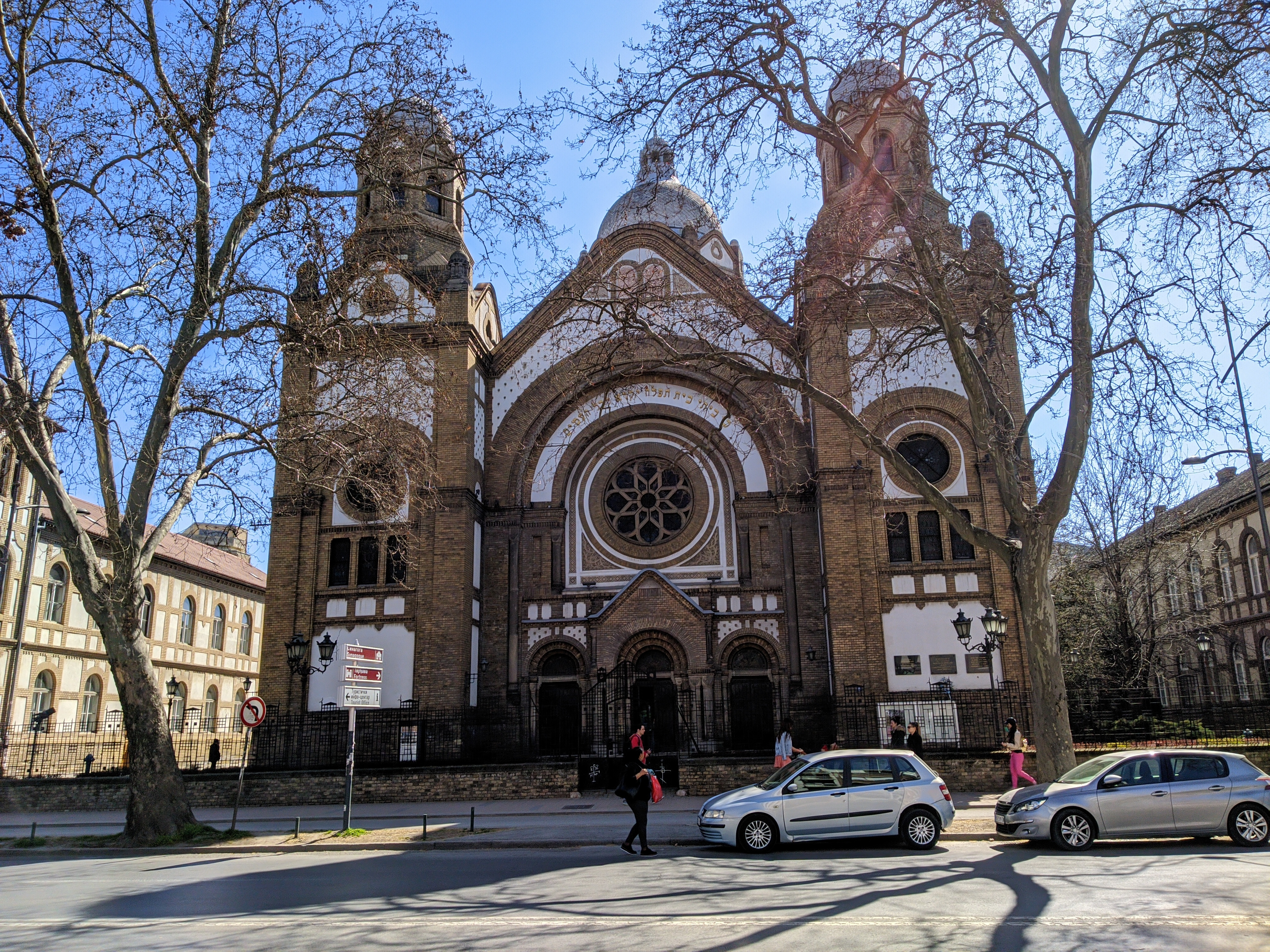
Novi Sad Synagogue by Lipót Baumhorn, 1909

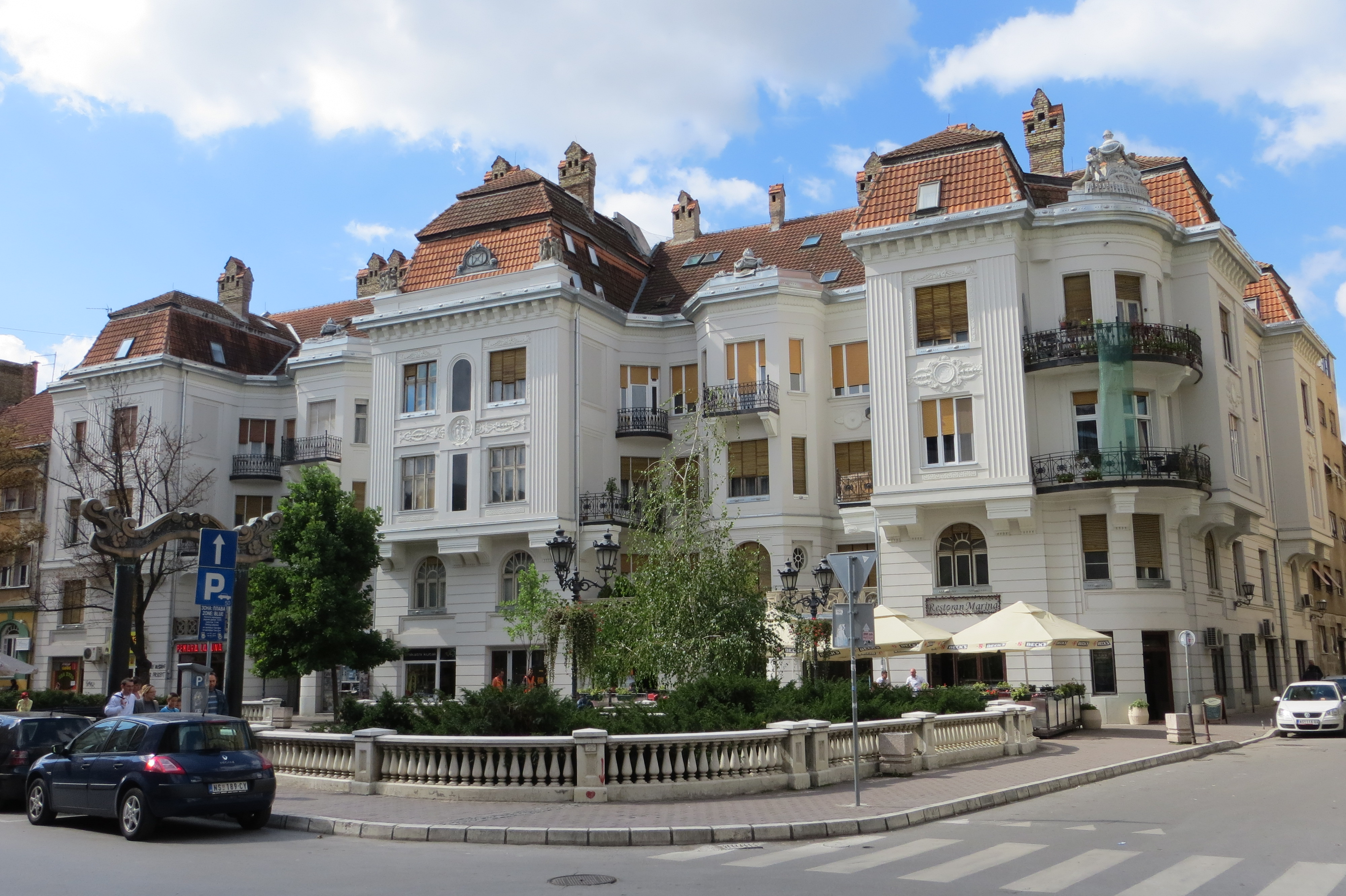
Adamović Family Palace by Geza Markuš i Friđeš Špigel, 1911

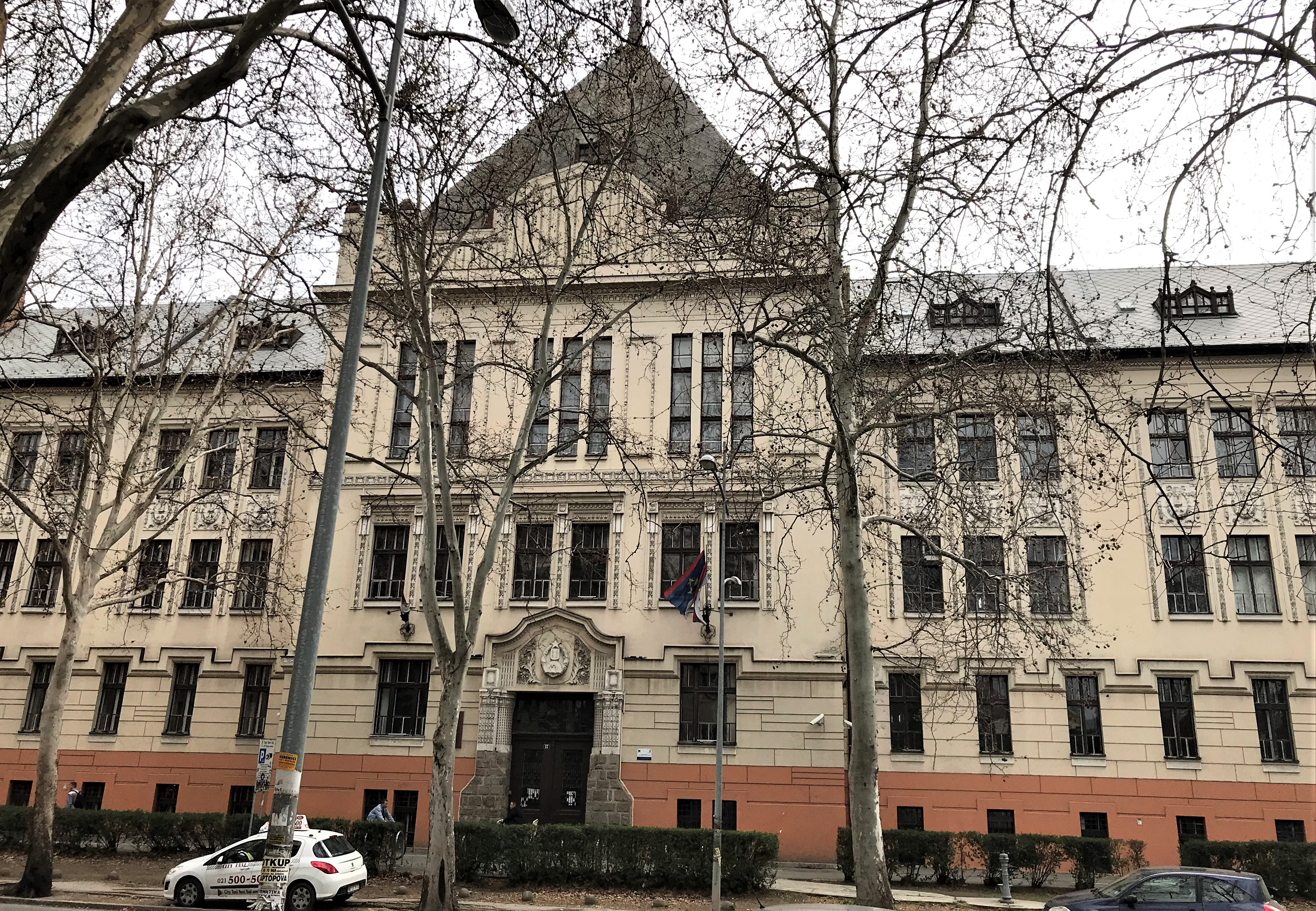
Mihajlo Pupin secondary school of electrical engineering by Bela Paklo i Štrob Mikša, 1921

Subotica has about 100 buildings built in the style of secession. The movement arrived in Subotica via Budapest and that there are two styles. One from European flows such as in Munich, Paris, Vienna, while the other is more committed, national, often called the Hungarian version of secession (Szecesszió). Among them are the most famous in the protected core of the city of Subotica, such as the City Hall, Synagogue, Former Savings Bank, and more, which were designed by Marcell Komor and Dezső Jakab. Subotica Synagogue is exceptional even among other Synagogues of Europe, being the second largest preserved Synagogue in Europe (after the Dohány Street Synagogue in Budapest, Hungary) and the only one in the distinct Hungarian Szecesszió style.

Most visual motifs on Subotica secession buildings convey a specific meaning and purpose. Example of this can be seen on the Former Savings Bank indicating its original purpose as a bank through the visuals on its outer façade. The hive and the stylized little owls are symbols of wisdom. The sun, the peacock feather, and the squirrels as faithful gatherers in the upper part of the Palace – all symbols that point to diligence and frugality. While Szecesszió is most prominent in Subotica, other Vojvodina cities, villages, and settlements showcase the style, such as the Arena Movie Theater in Sombor.

- Subotica: Synagogue (1901), Raichle Palace (1904), City Hall (1910),
- Sombor: Arena (Sombor) Movie Theater (1912),
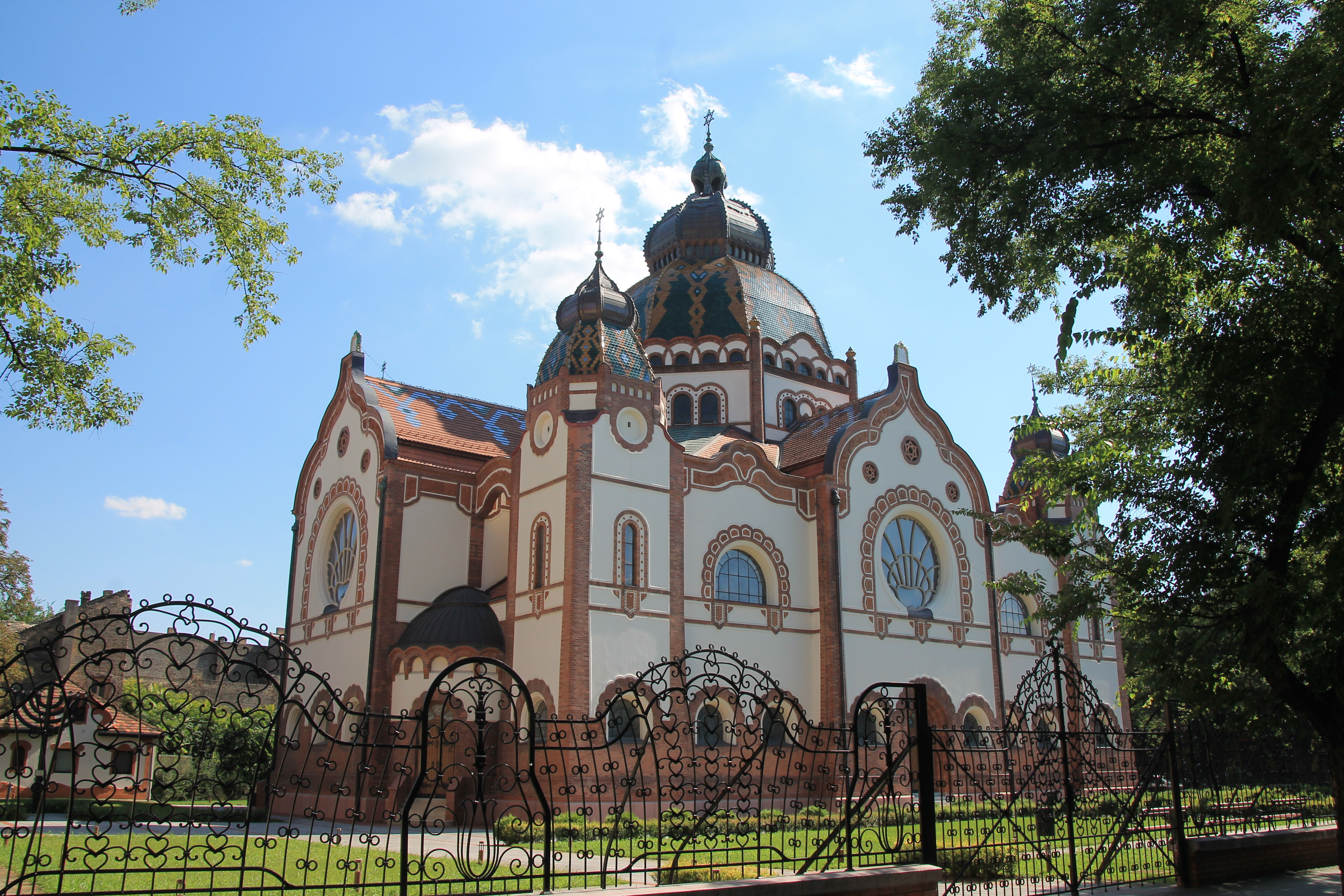
Subotica Synagogue by Marcell Komor and Dezső Jakab, 1901

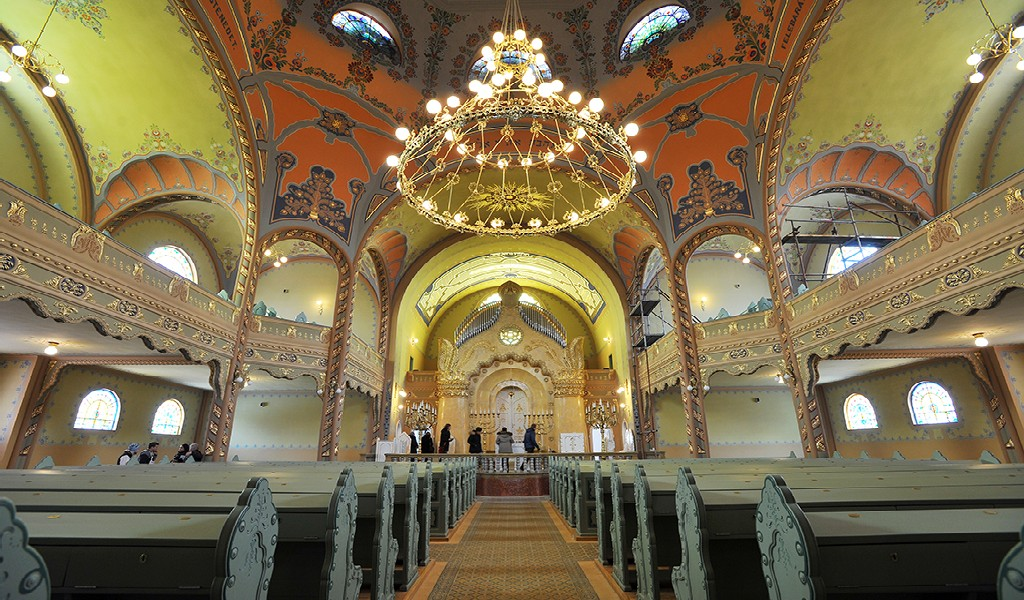
Subotica Synagogue interior by Marcell Komor and Dezső Jakab, 1901

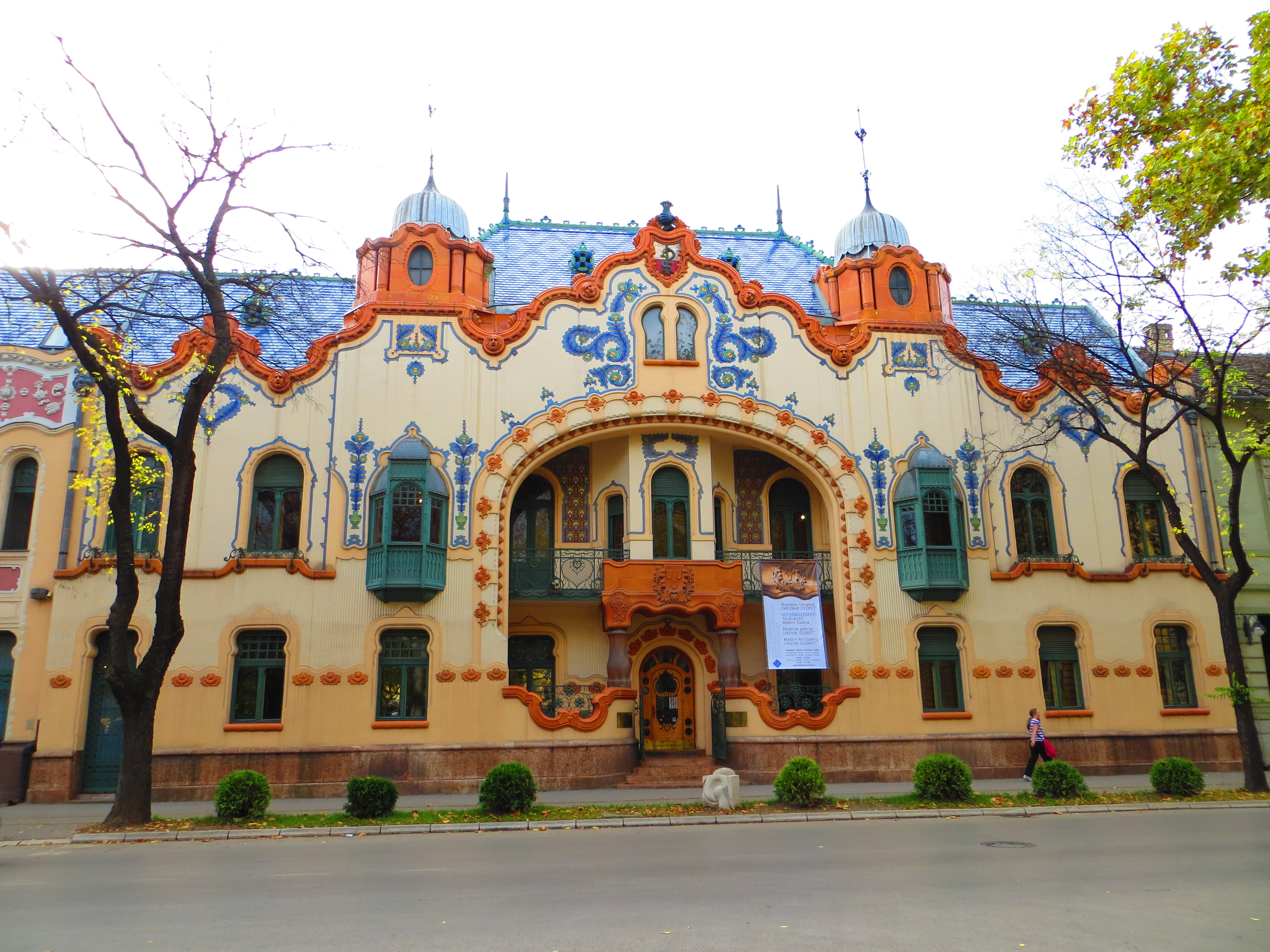
Raichle Palace, 1904

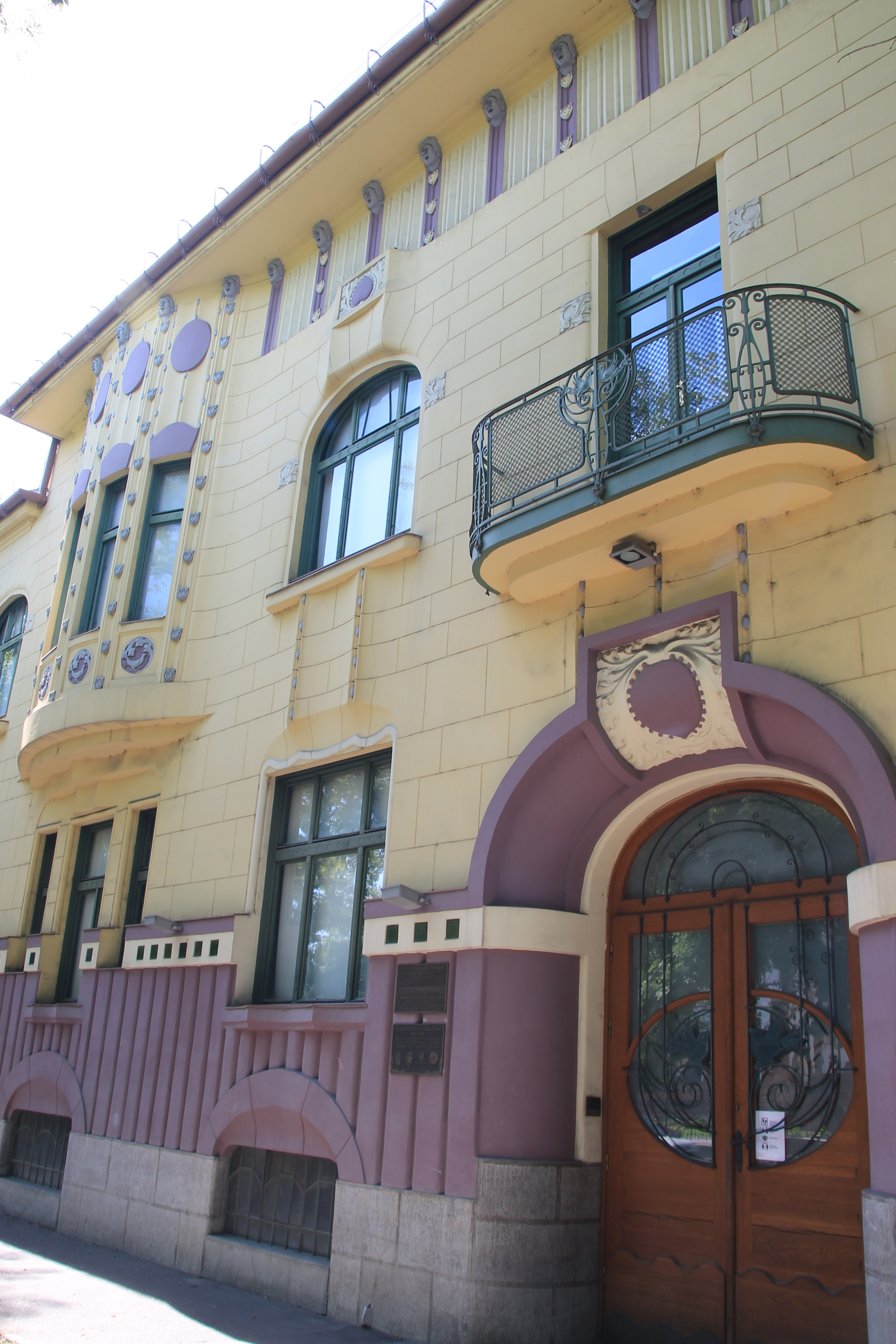
Municipal Museum by Vágó Brothers, 1906

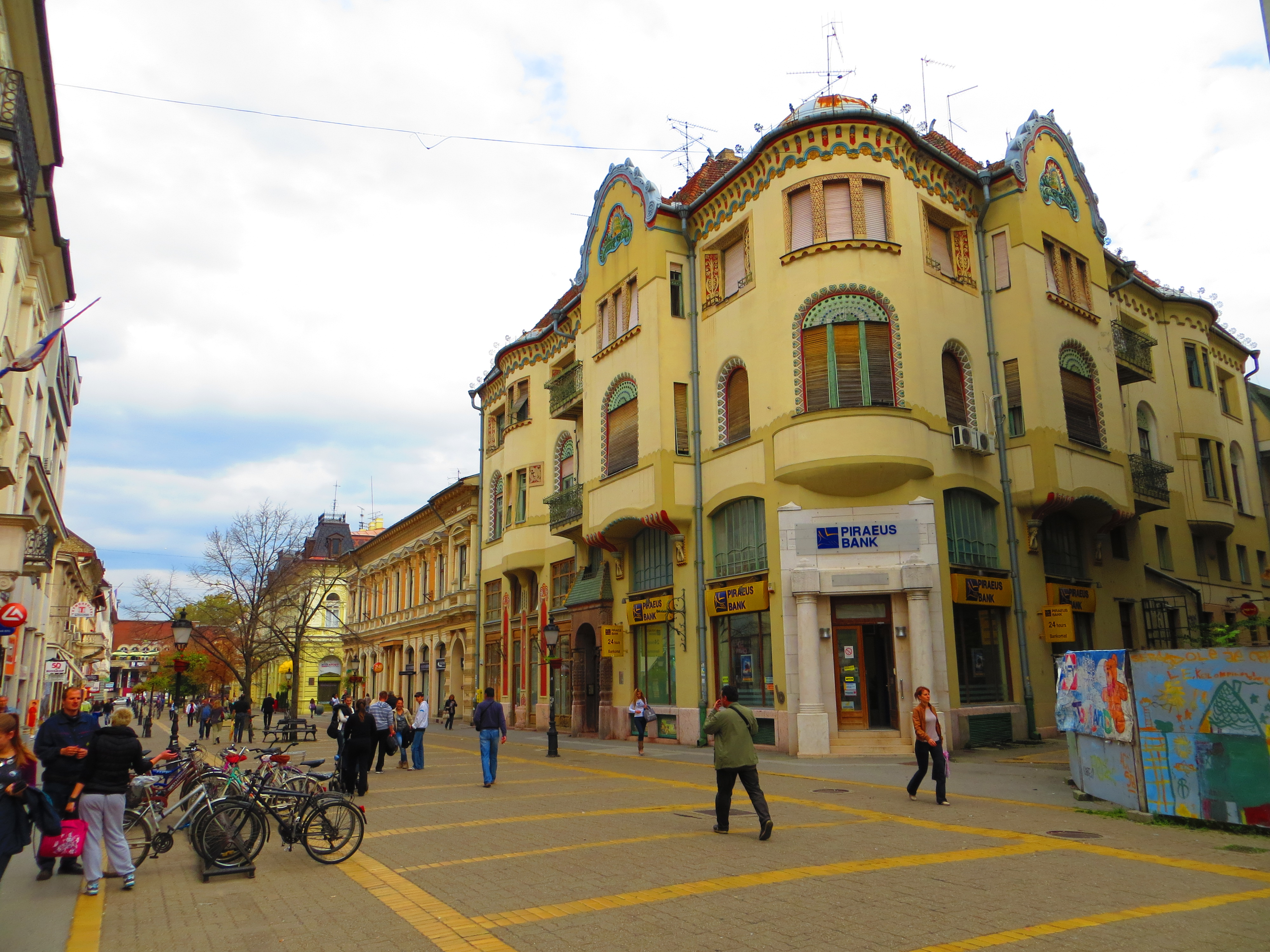
Former Savings Bank by Marcell Komor and Dezső Jakab, 1907

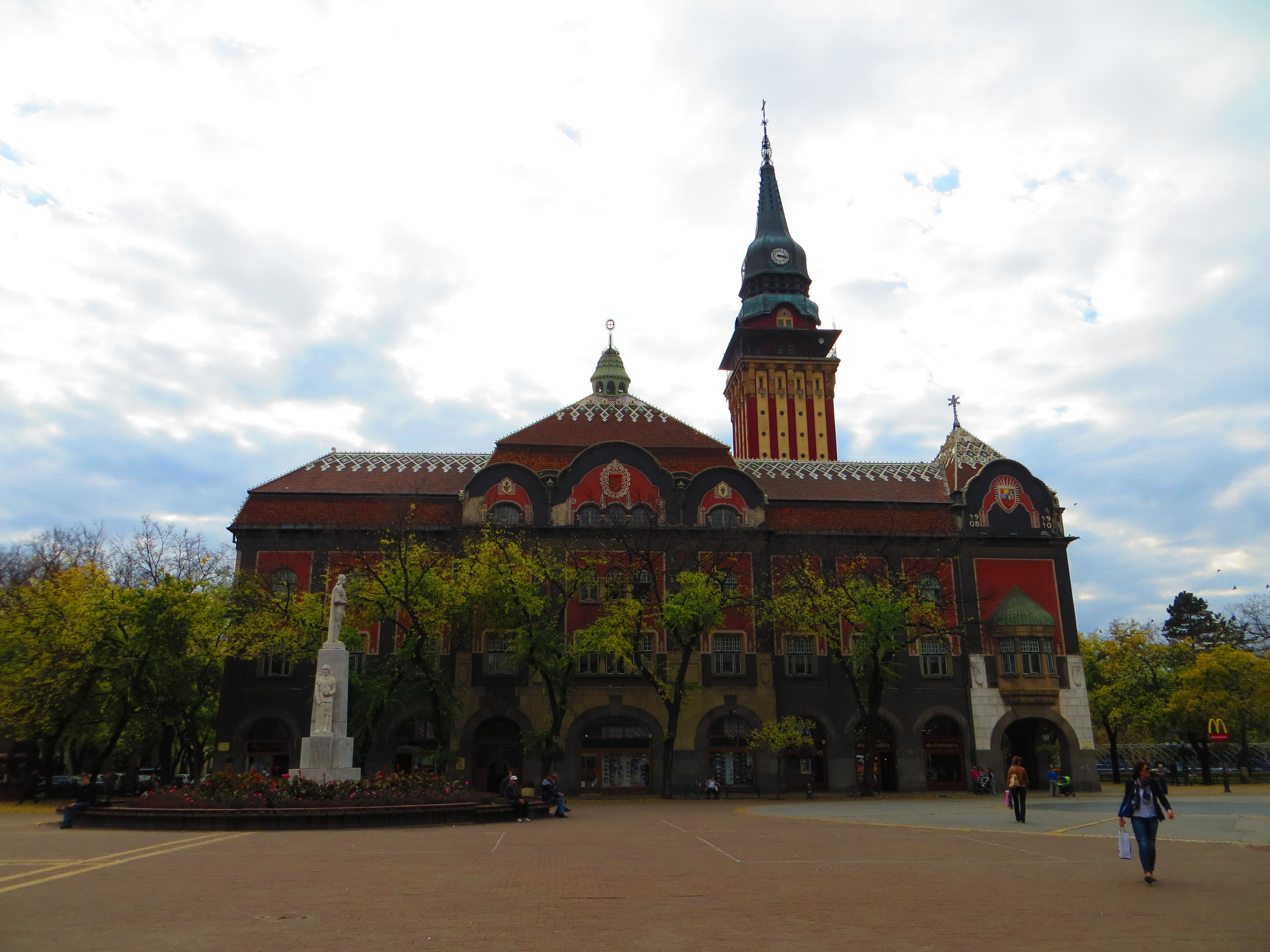
Subotica City Hall by Marcell Komor and Dezső Jakab, 1910

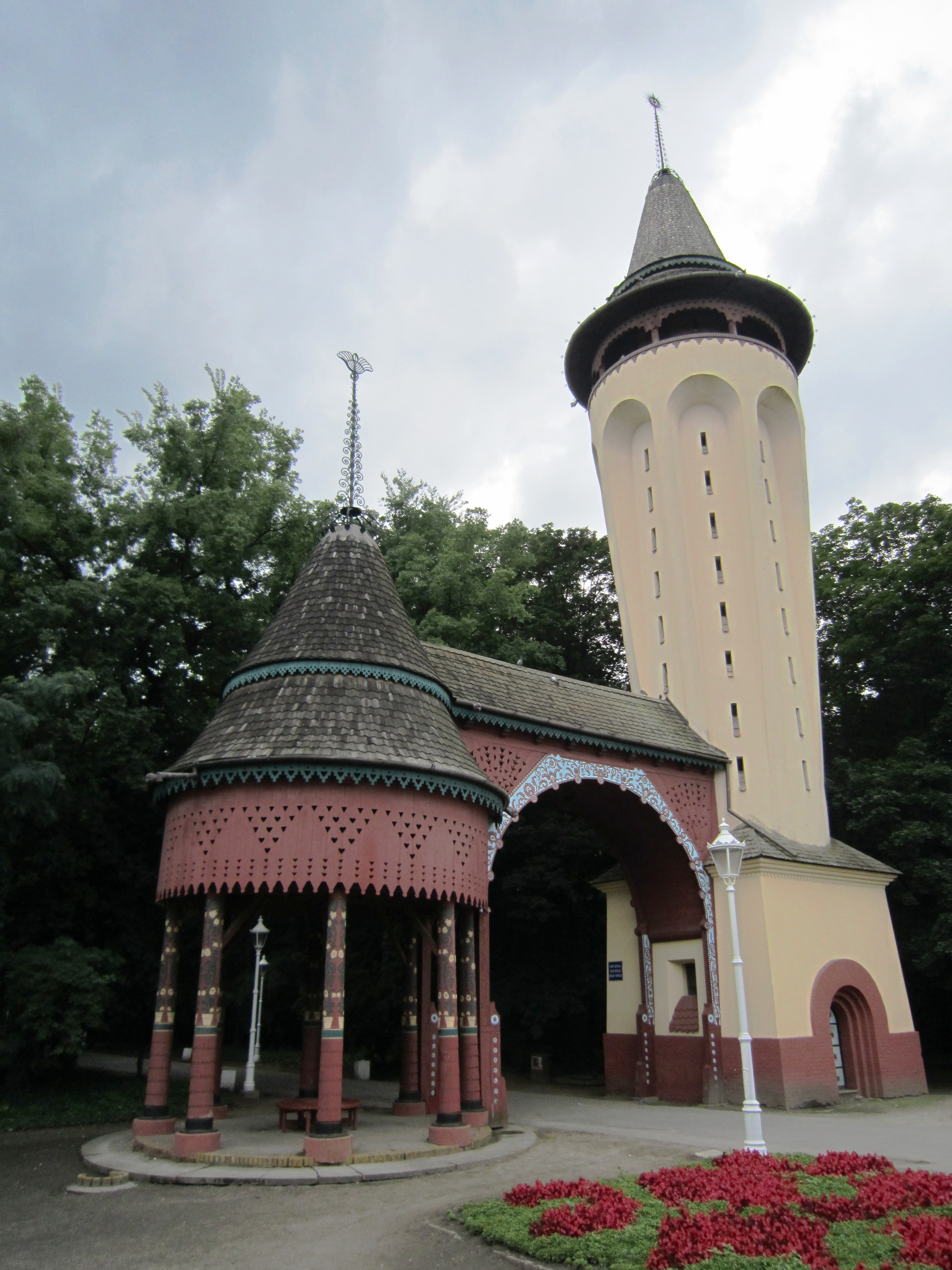
Palić water tower by Marcell Komor and Dezső Jakab, 1910

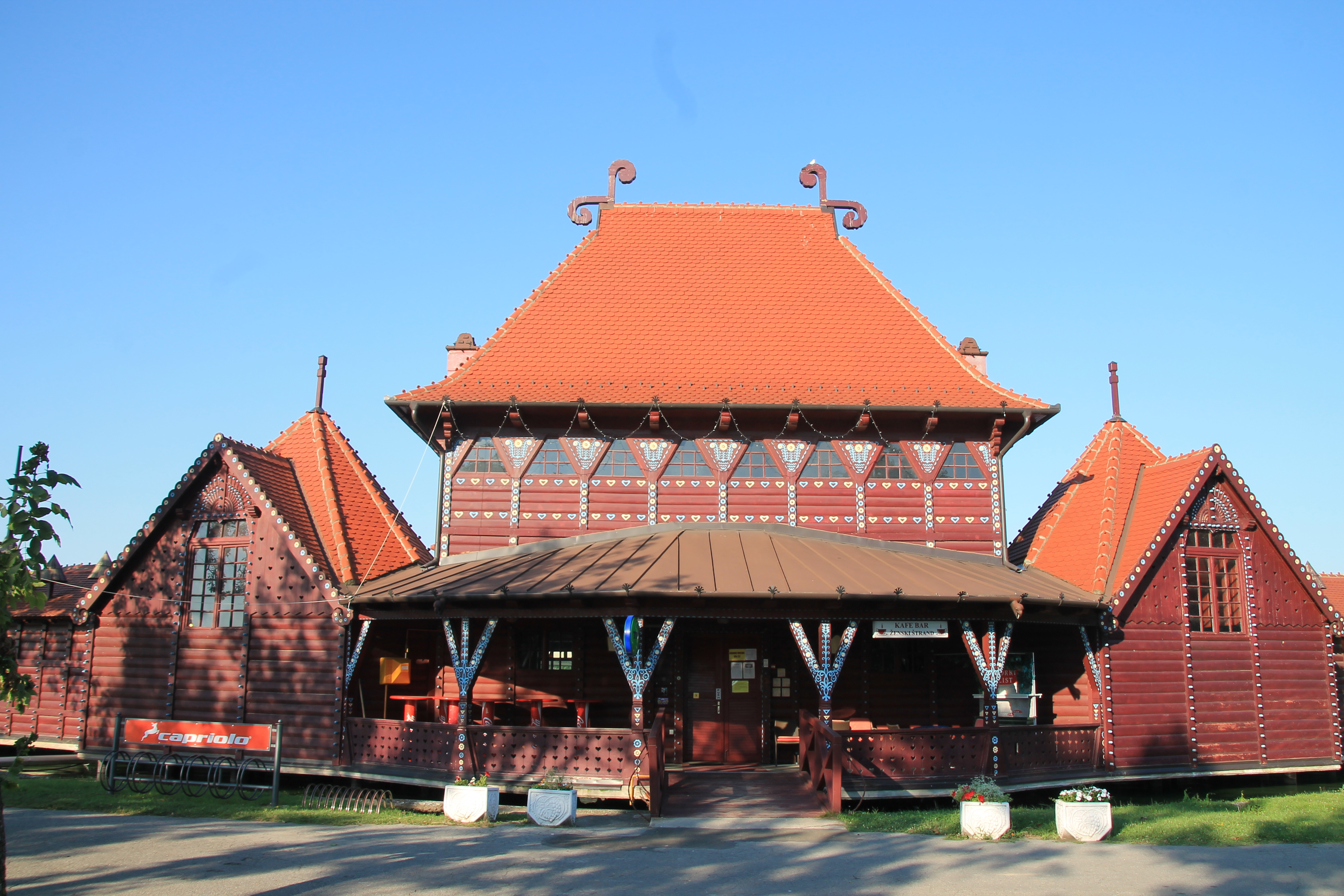
Women's Pavilion by Marcell Komor and Dezső Jakab, 1910

Most of the Zrenjanin secession buildings were built at the end of the 19th century, at a time of intense economic growth and very vibrant construction activity, which is particularly accelerated before the start of the First World War. Both Vienna and Hungarian Szecesszió styles were prevalent in the city for both residential homes, villas, and important institutional buildings such as the City Hall. Karlo Helmbold's House, also known as Šeherezada, is a rare example of Moorish Revival style in Serbia, with both secession and oriental elements blended together.

- Zrenjanin: Lipot Goldšmit's House (1870s), City Hall (1887), Karađorđević Bridge (1904), Dunđerski Family Palace (1906), Bence House (1909),
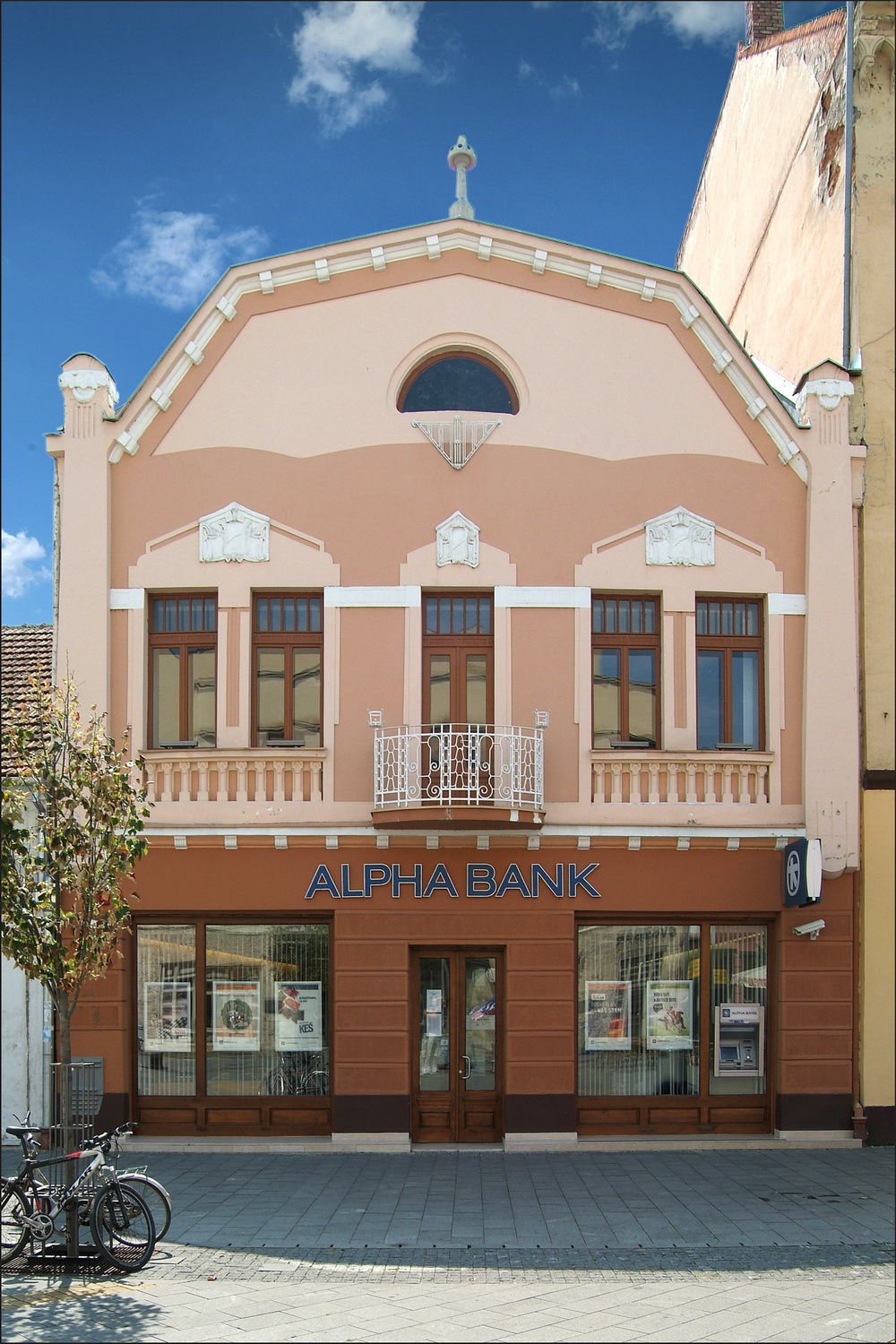
Lipot Goldšmit's House, 1870s

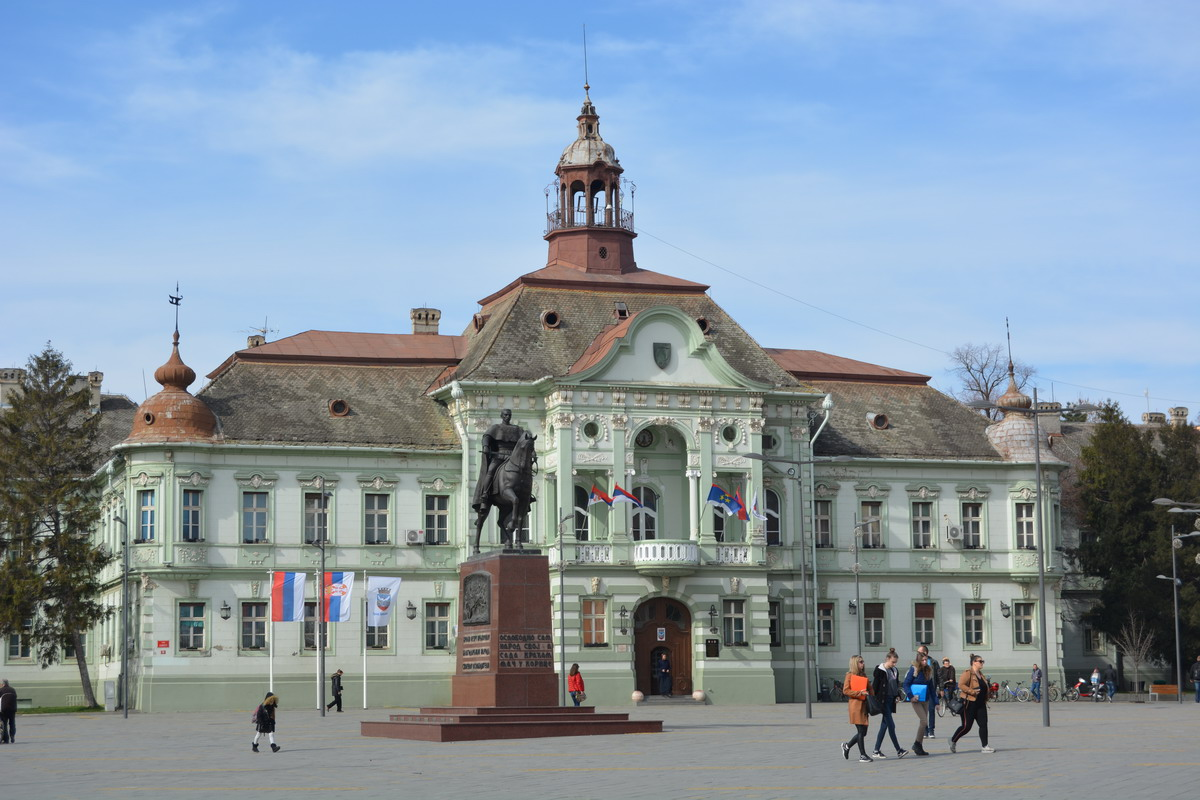
City Hall by Gyula Pártos and Ödön Lechner, 1887

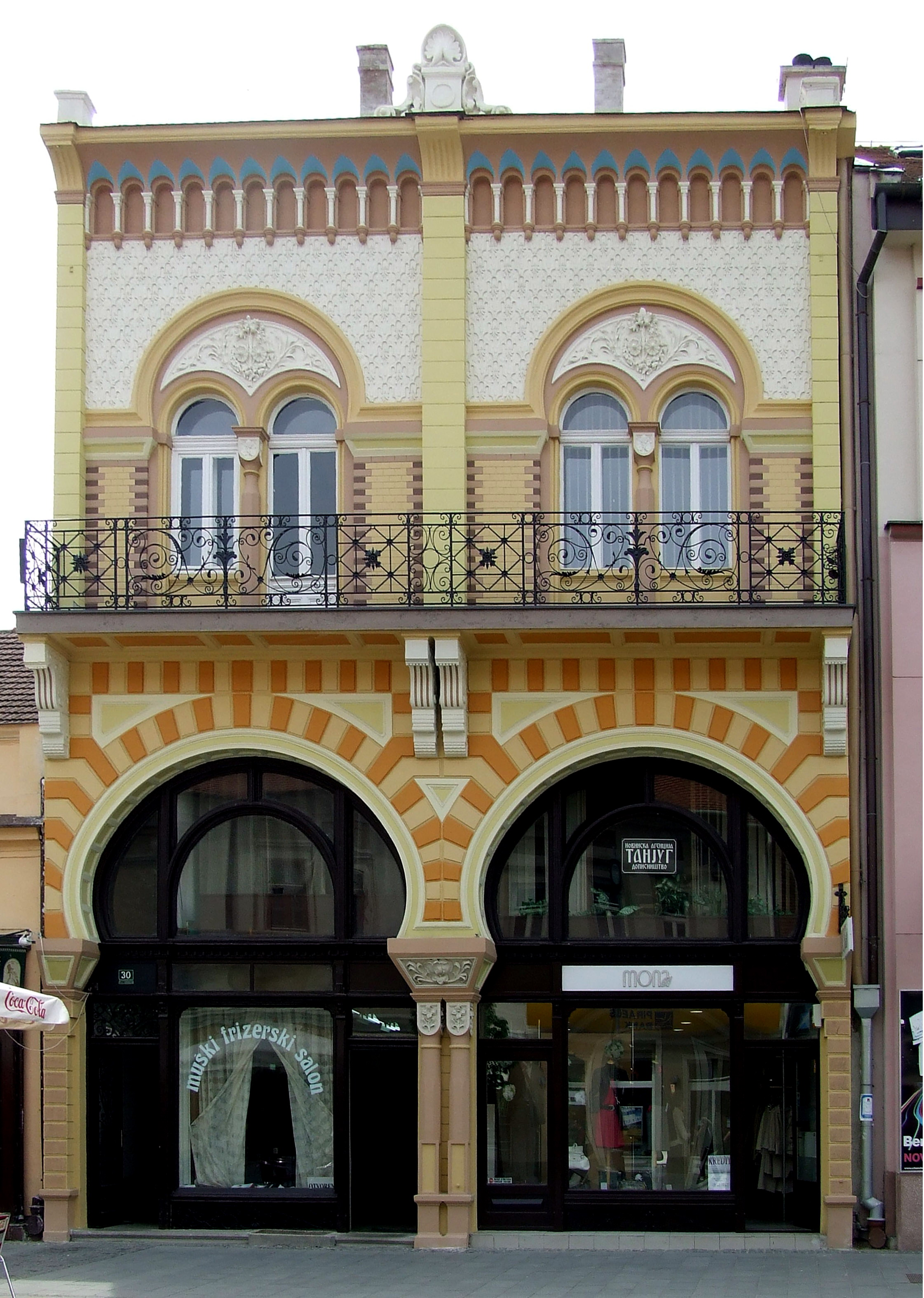
Karlo Helmbold's House (Šeherezada) by Ištvan Bart, 1900

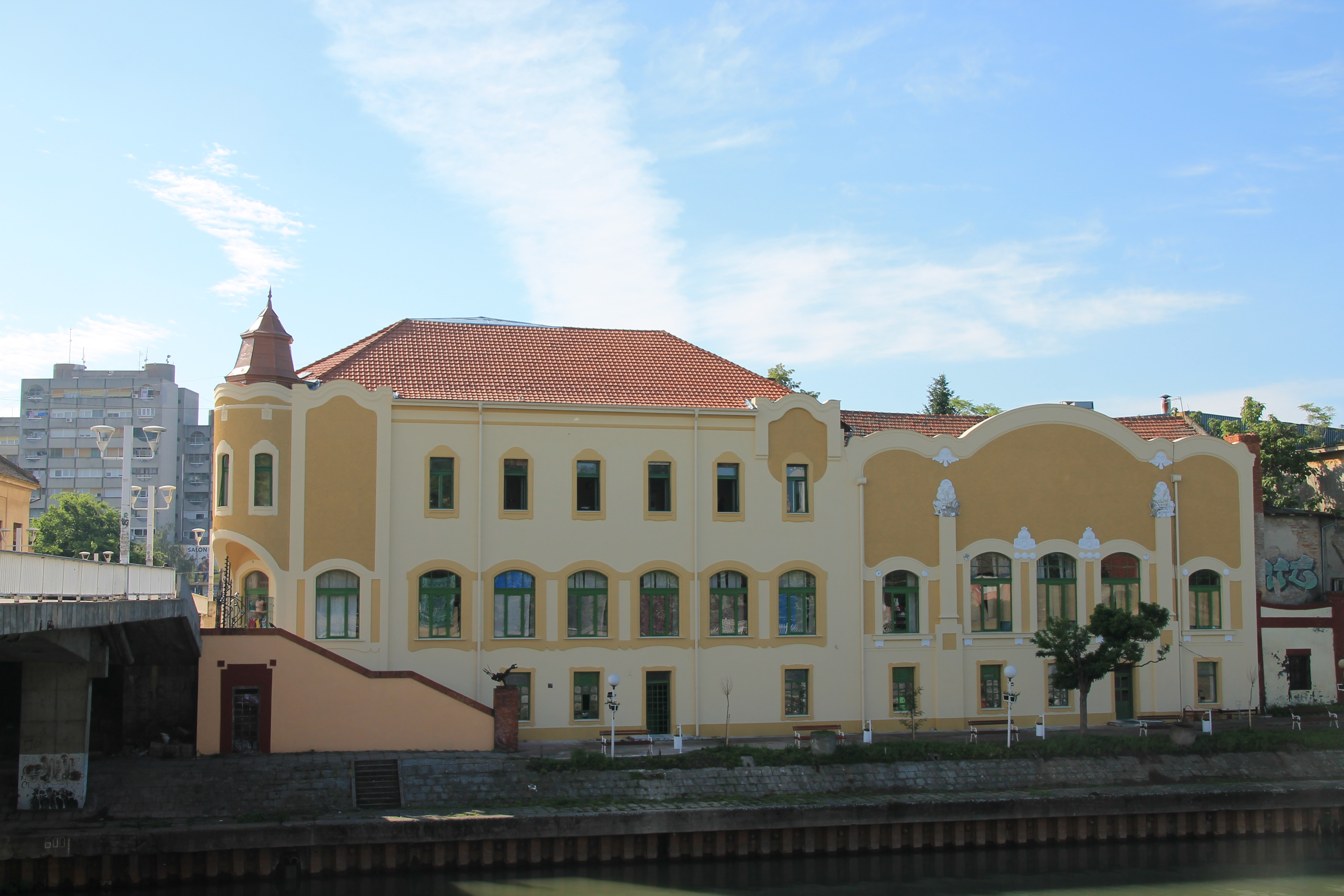
Dunđerski Family Palace, 1906

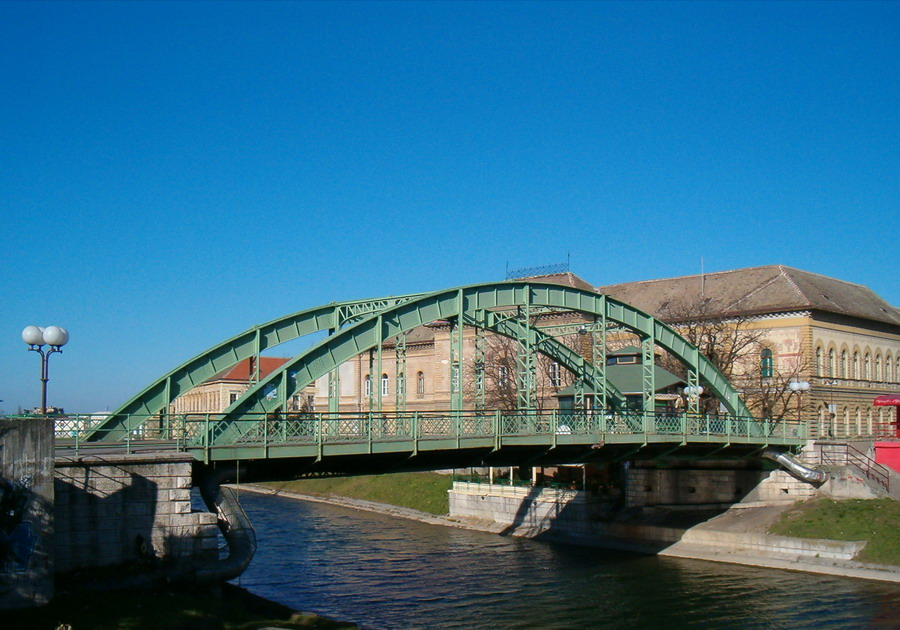
Karadžić Bridge (previously named Franz Joseph Bridge), 1904

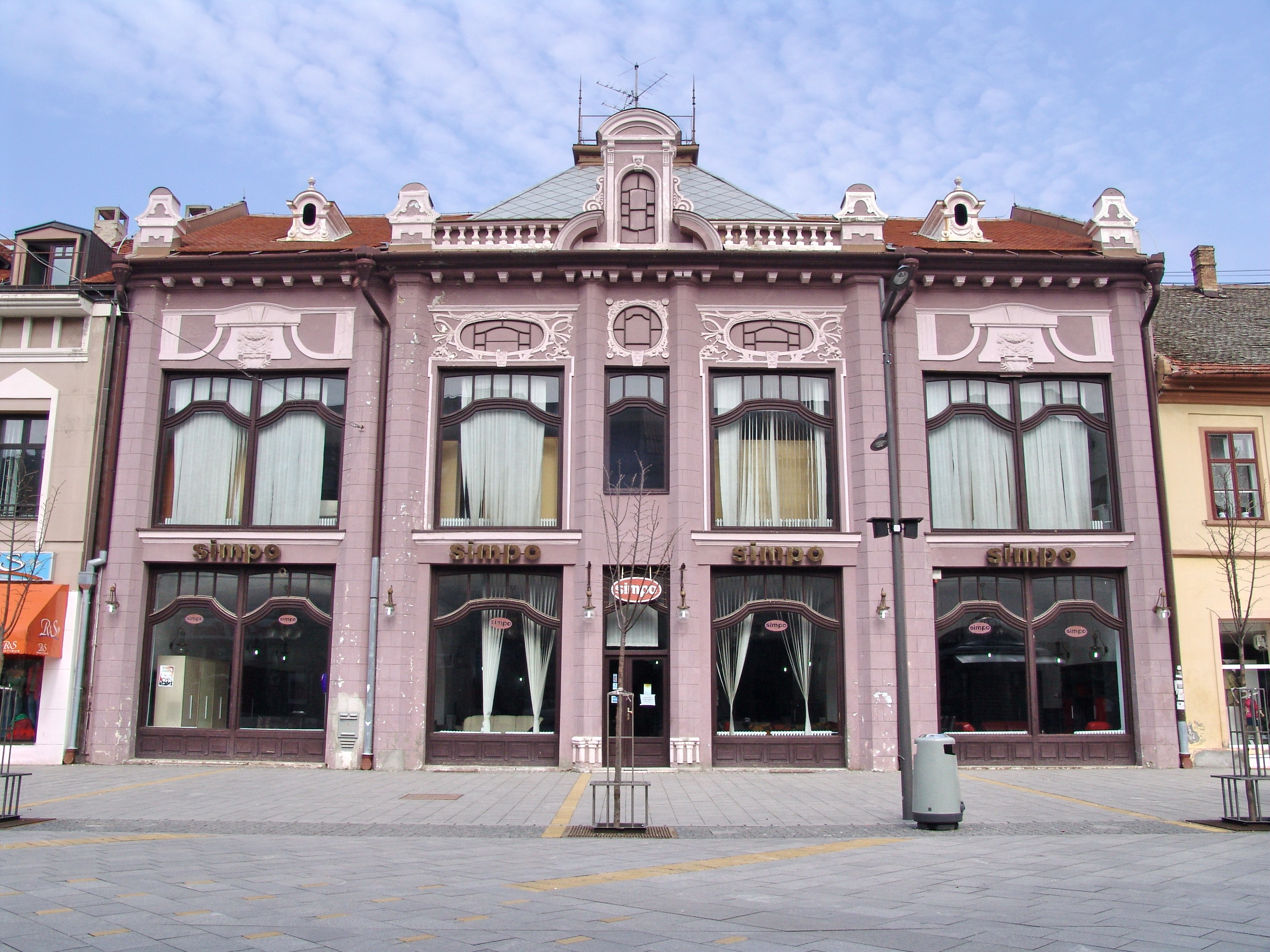
Bence House, 1909

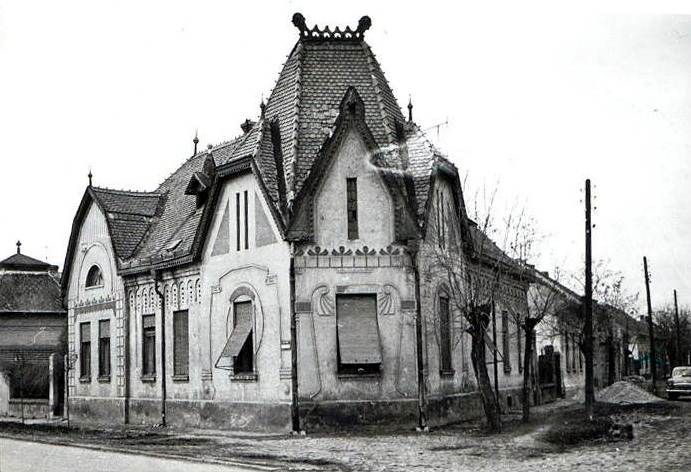
Professor Borjanović's House by János Pányi, 1913

Belgrade at the turn of the 20th century would showcase a wide array of secessionist architecture, both international and local styles. Most common international style was from Vienna, with buildings of Merchant Stamenković, Uroš Predić and Leona Panajot showcasing this style's common visual patterns. The local style evolved from Serbo-Byzantine Revival, adding Serbian national motifs with secessionist sensibilities. Buildings such as the House of Vuk's Foundation and Old telephone exchange by Branko Tanazević, and Old Post Office by Momir Korunović, showcase the blend of medieval church motifs with modern art nouveau. Most non-religious Serbo-Byzantine Revival architecture had secessionist motifs in its design, such as the Courthouse in Niš.

- Belgrade: Hotel Moskva (1908), Vučo’s House on the Sava River (1908), Uros Predic's Studio (1908), Mika Alas's House (1910),
- Pančevo: Pučka Bank (1868),
- Niš: Courthouse (1910).
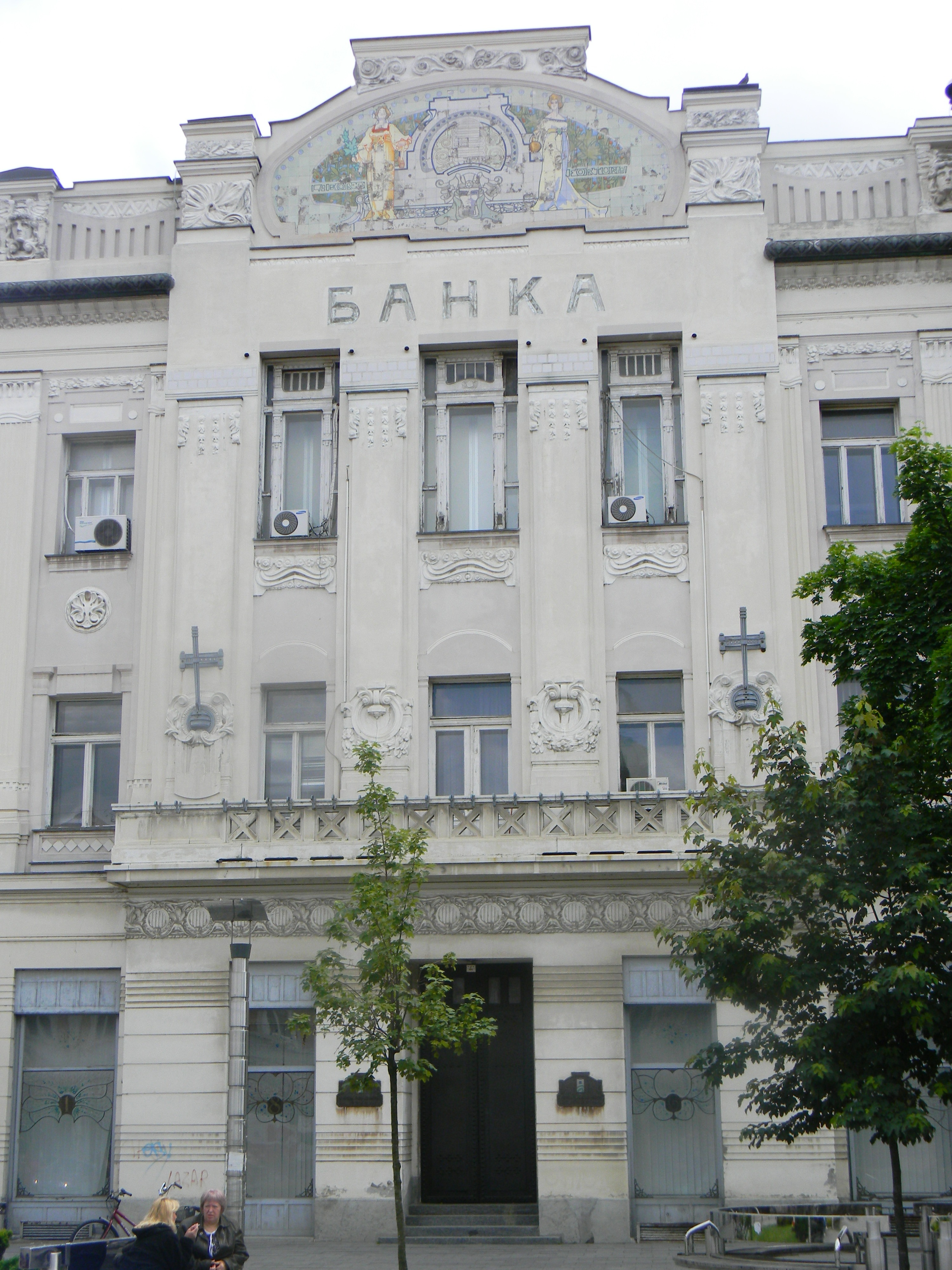
Pučka Bank in Pančevo by Albert Kálmán Kőrössy and Ullmann Gyula, 1868

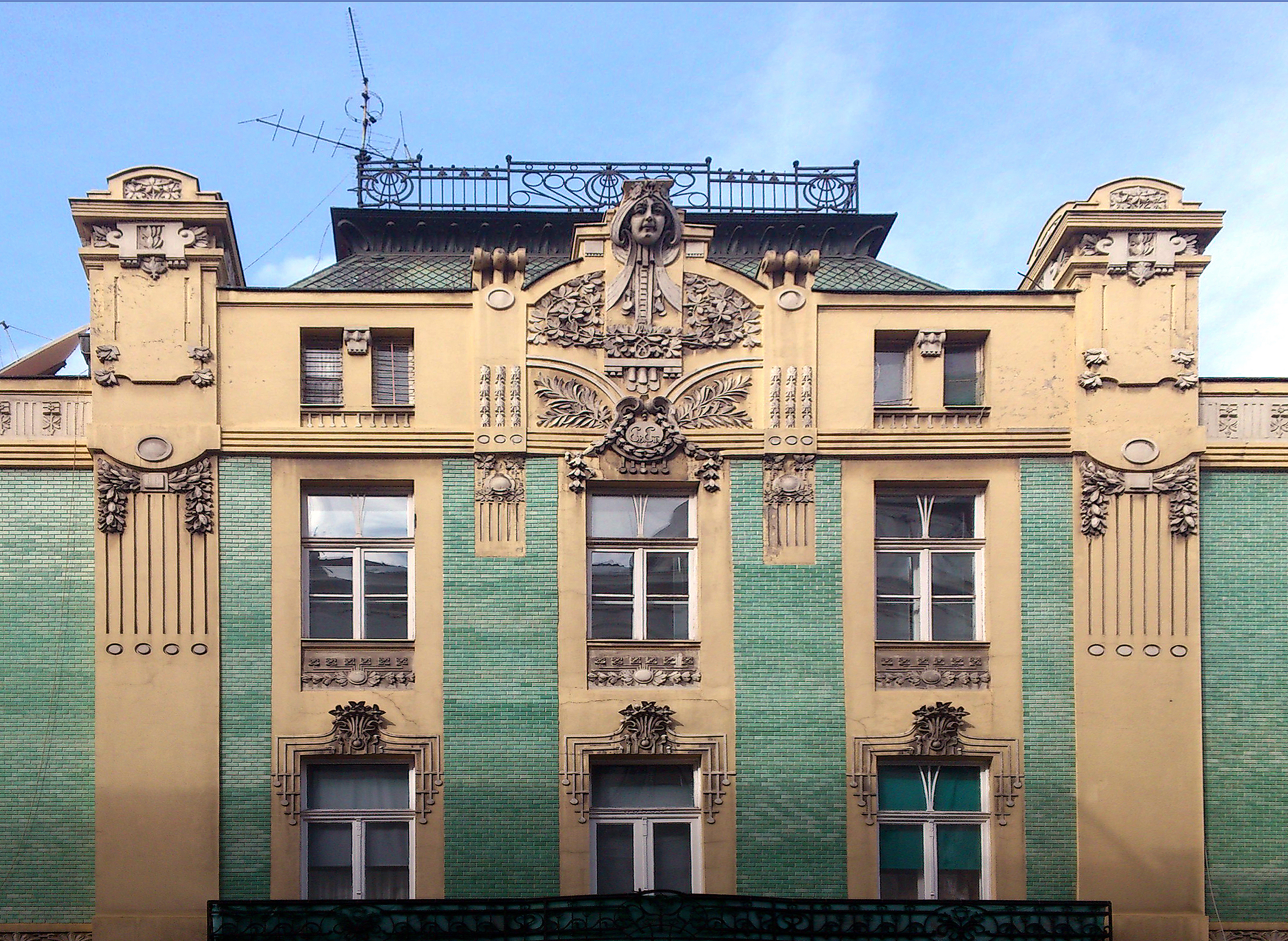
Building of Merchant Stamenković in Belgrade by Andra Stevanović and Nikola Nestorović, 1907

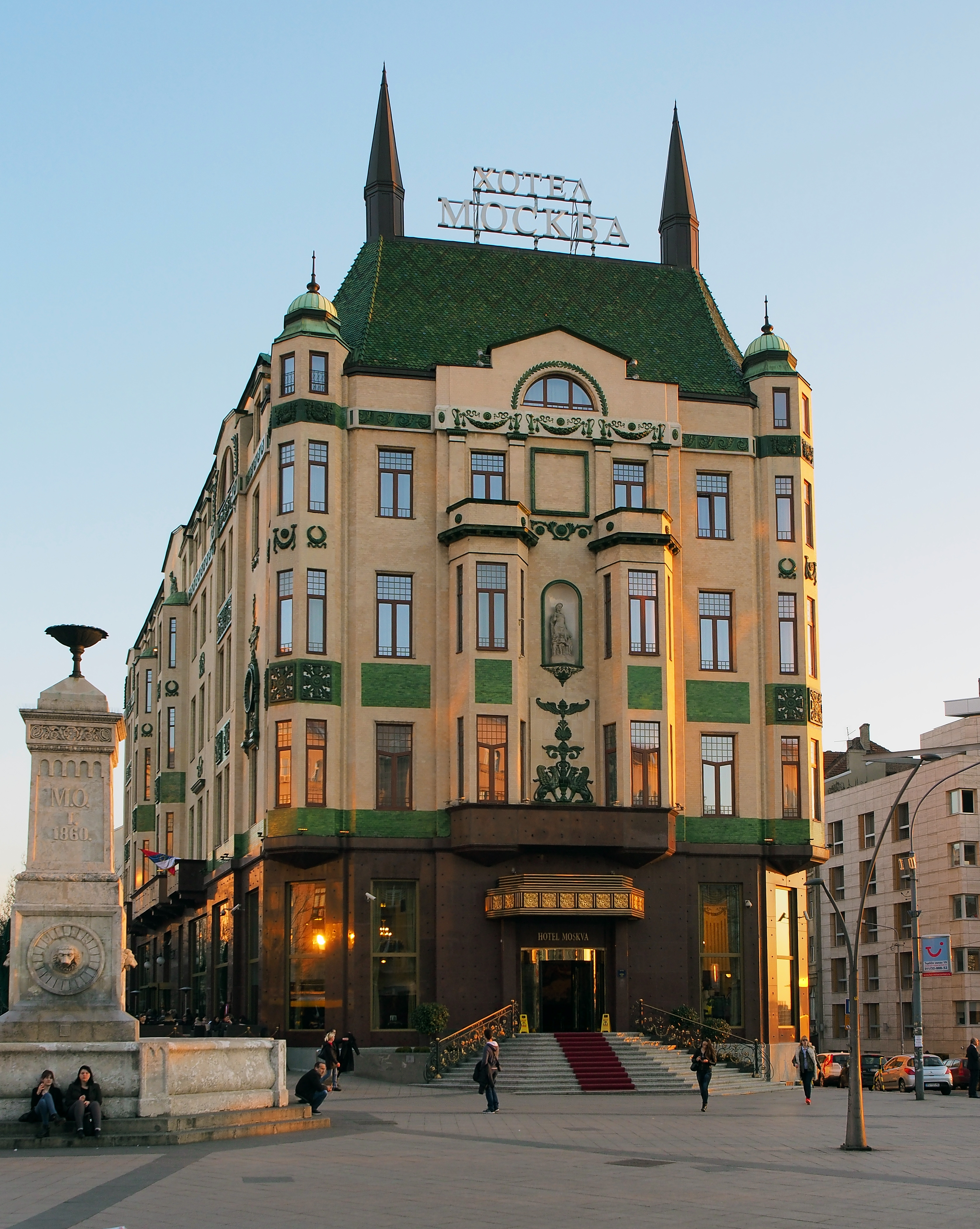
Hotel Moskva in Belgrade by Jovan Ilkić, 1908

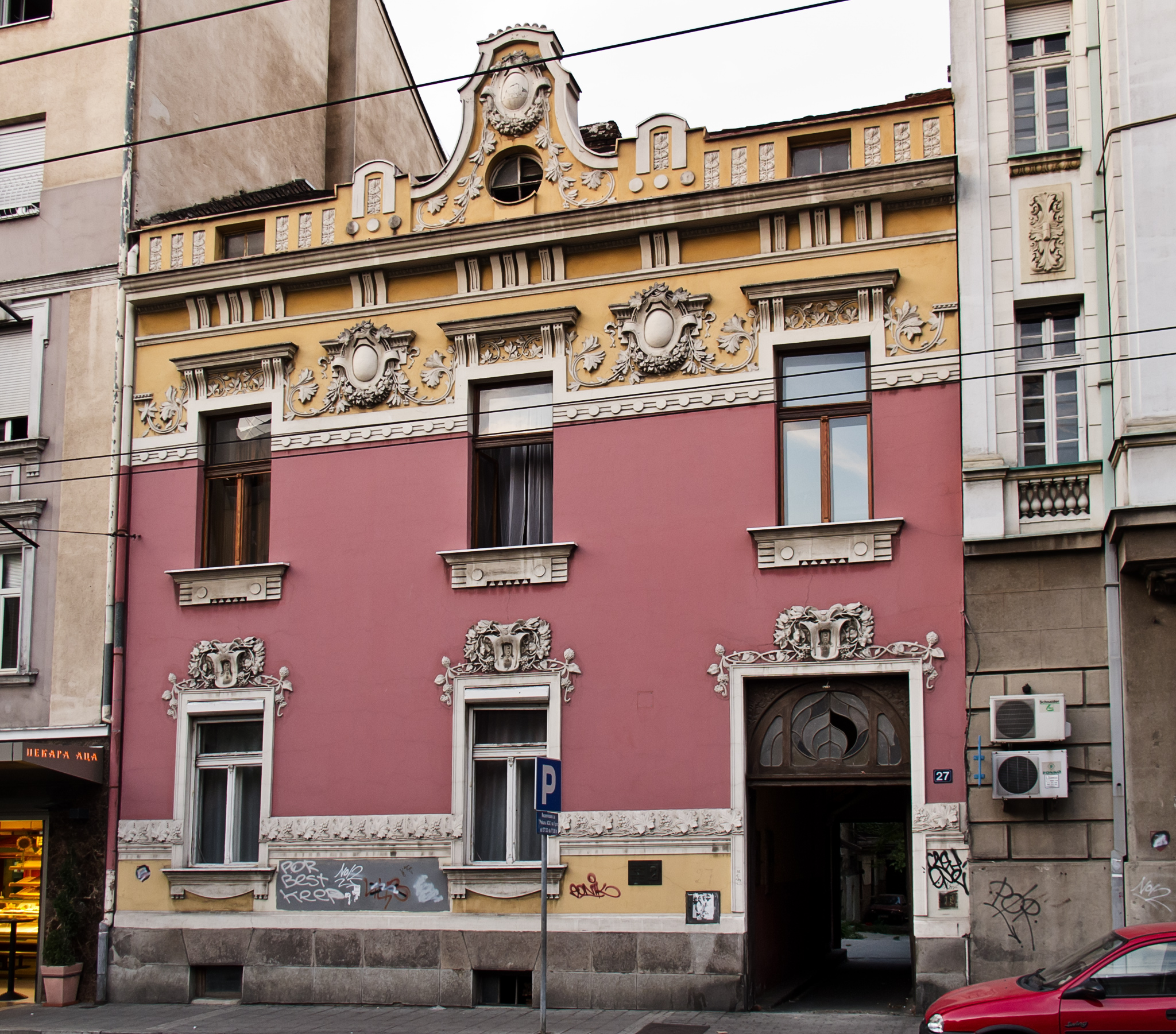
Uros Predic's Studio built in Vienna Secession style in Belgrade, 1908

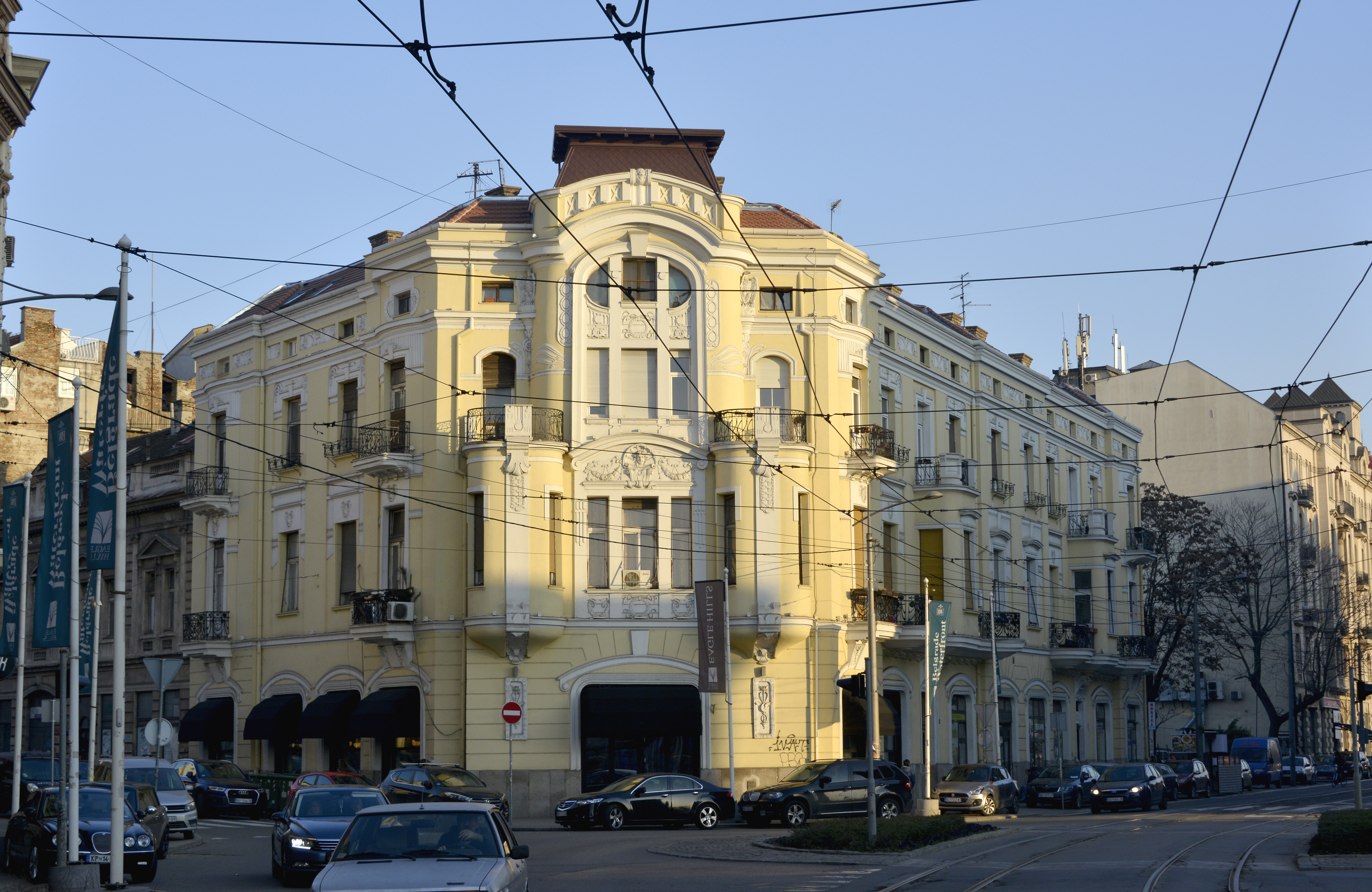
Vučo’s House on the Sava River, 1908

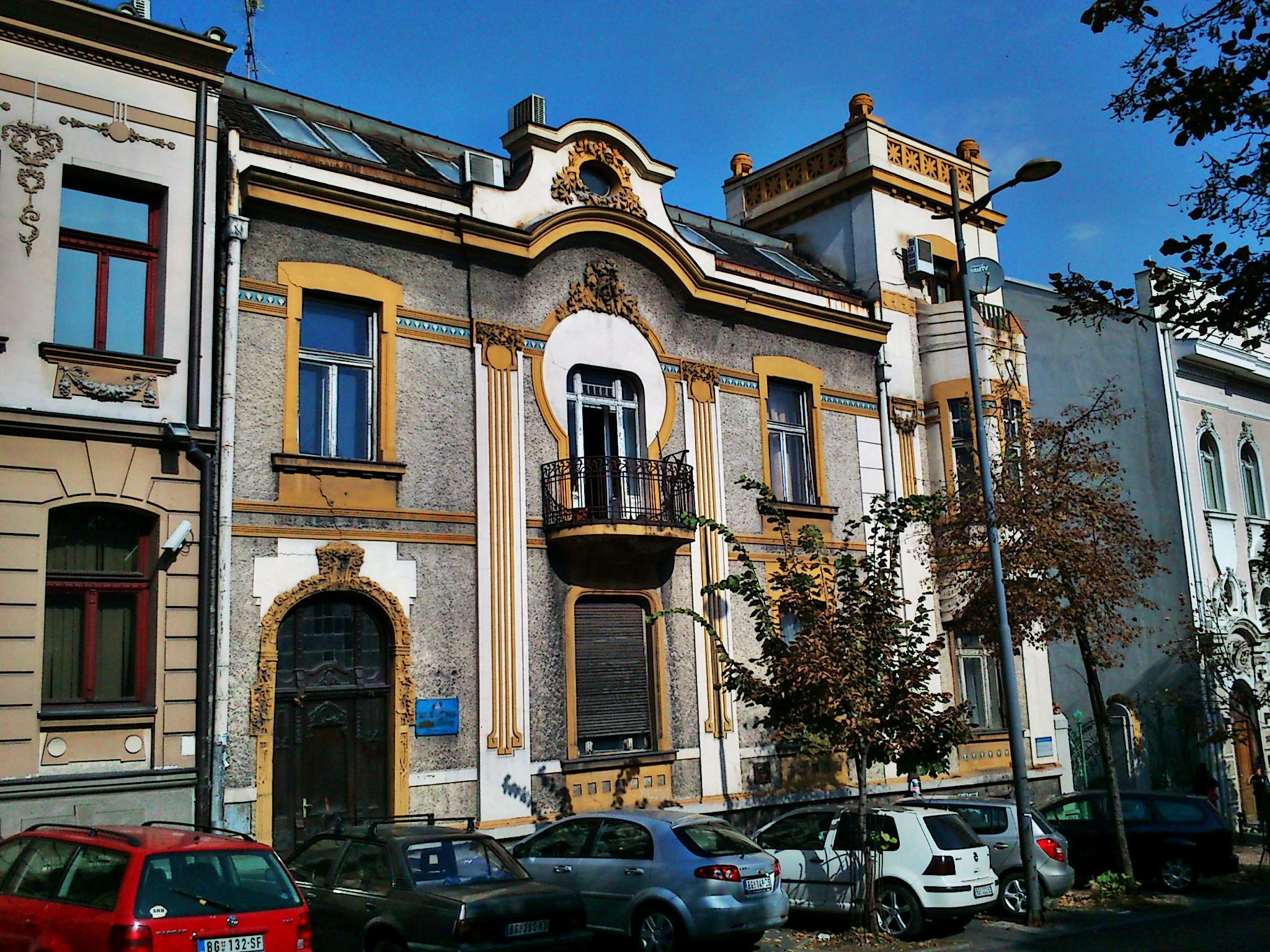
House of Leona Panajot by Đura Bajalović in Belgrade, 1908

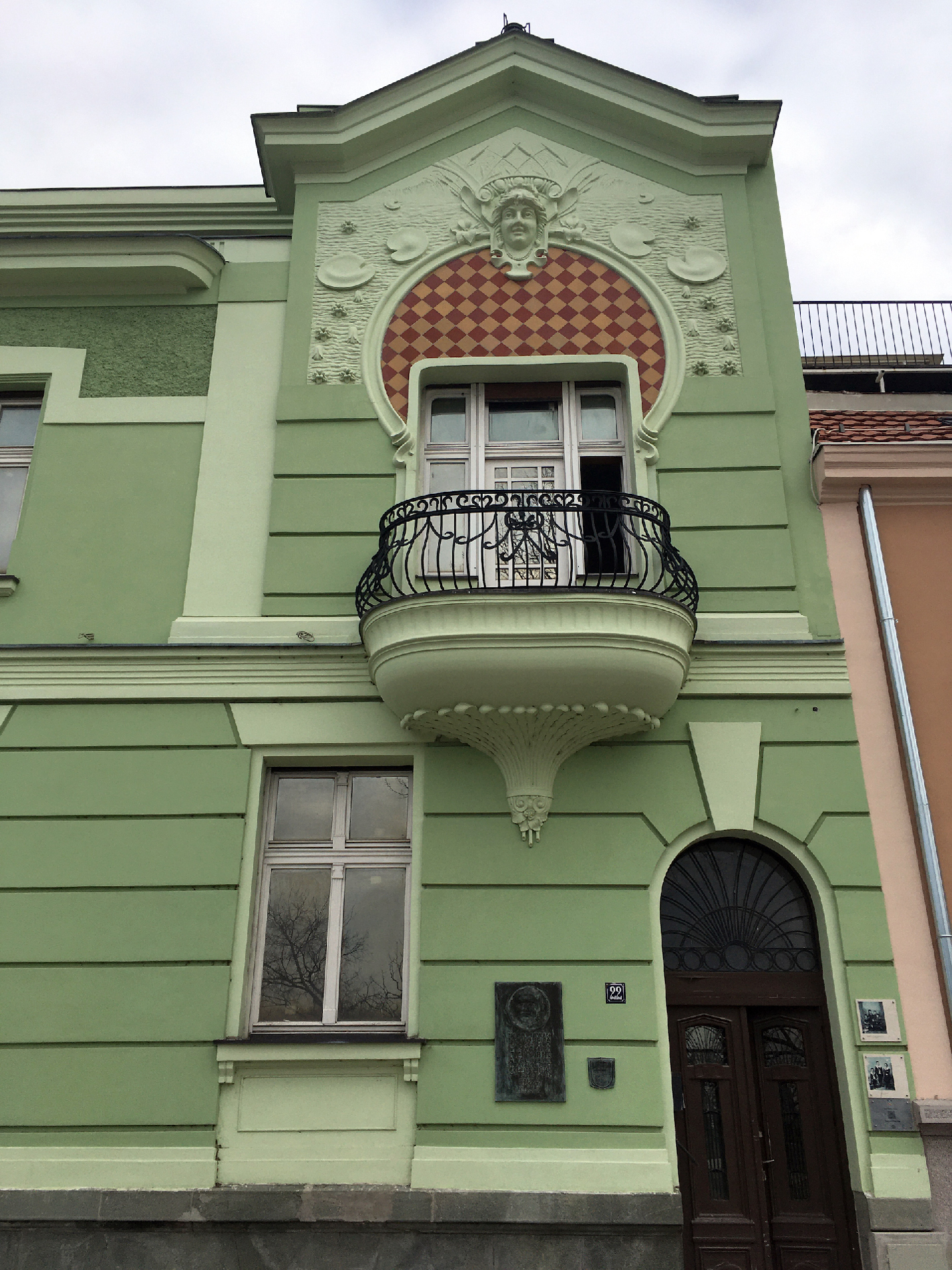
Mika Alas's House in Belgrade by Petar Bajalović, 1910

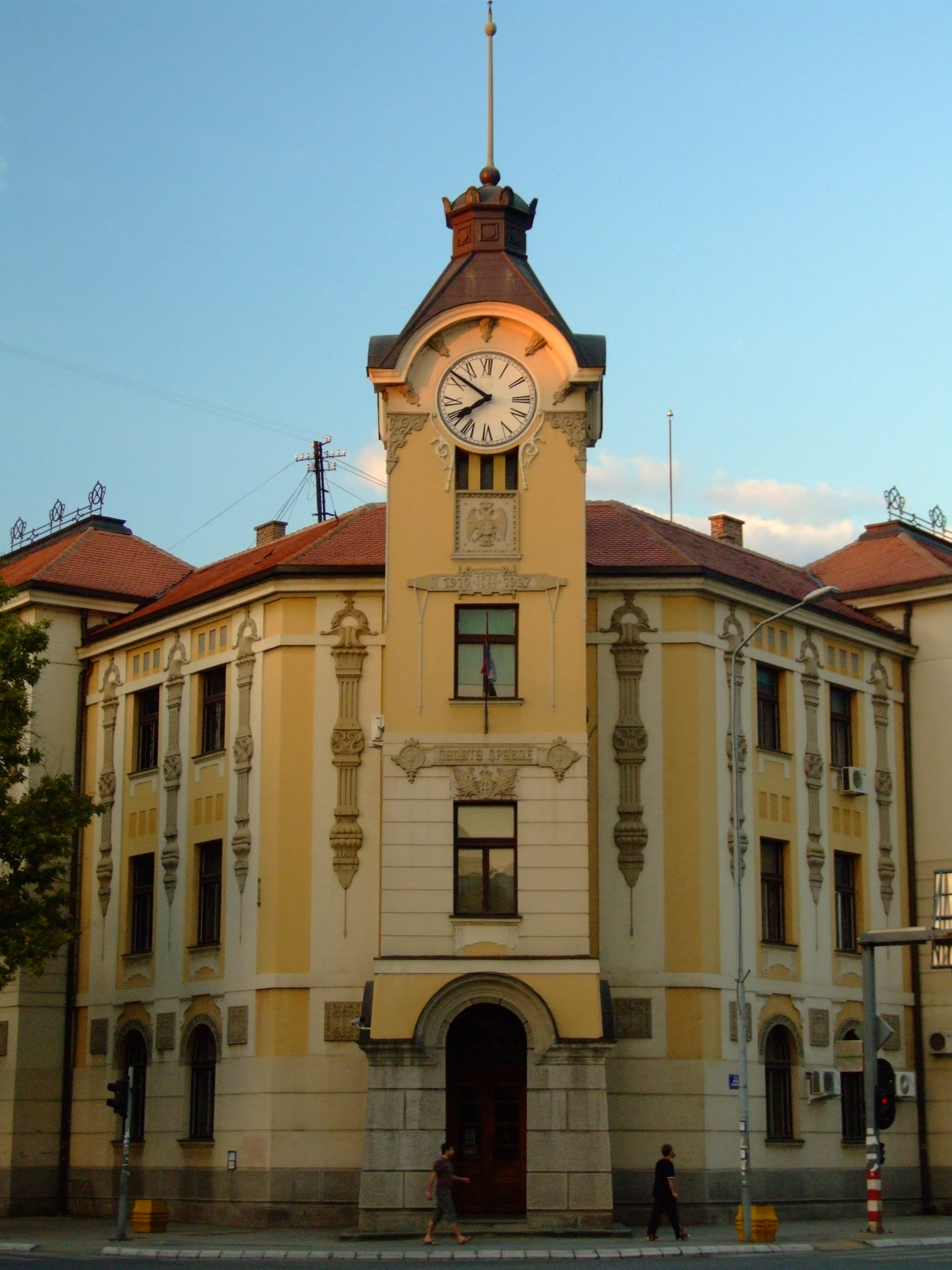
Courthouse by Jovan Novaković in Niš, 1910

== Royalist Yugoslav period ==
Yugoslav architecture emerged in the first decades of the 20th century before the establishment of the state; during this period a number of South Slavic creatives, enthused by the possibility of statehood, organized a series of art exhibitions in Serbia in the name of a shared Slavic identity. Following governmental centralization after the 1918 creation of the Kingdom of Yugoslavia, this initial bottom-up enthusiasm began to fade. Yugoslav architecture became more dictated by an increasingly concentrated state authority which sought to establish a unified state identity.

Beginning the 1920s, Yugoslav architects began to advocate for architectural modernism, viewing the style as the logical extension of progressive national narratives. The Group of Architects of the Modern Movement, an organization founded in 1928 by architects Branislav Kojić, Milan Zloković, Jan Dubovy, and Dušan Babić pushed for the widespread adoption of modern architecture as the "national" style of Yugoslavia to transcended regional differences. Despite these shifts, differing relationships to the west made the adoption of modernism inconsistent in Yugoslavia WWII. Of all Yugoslavian cities, Belgrade and Novi Sad have the highest concentration of modernist structures. Air Force Command by Dragiša Brašovan is one of the biggest interwar modernist buildings in Belgrade, and Danube Banovina in Novi Sad of the same architect being the best example of stripped classicism in Serbia.

=== Interwar Eclecticism and Academic Style ===
A continuation of the pre-war Eclectic Styles, the interwar Academic Style was spearheaded by architects from the Serbian Academy of Sciences and Arts as well as white émigré from the Russian Empire, fleeing the Soviets. It uses all historic revival styles from the past century in its visual design.

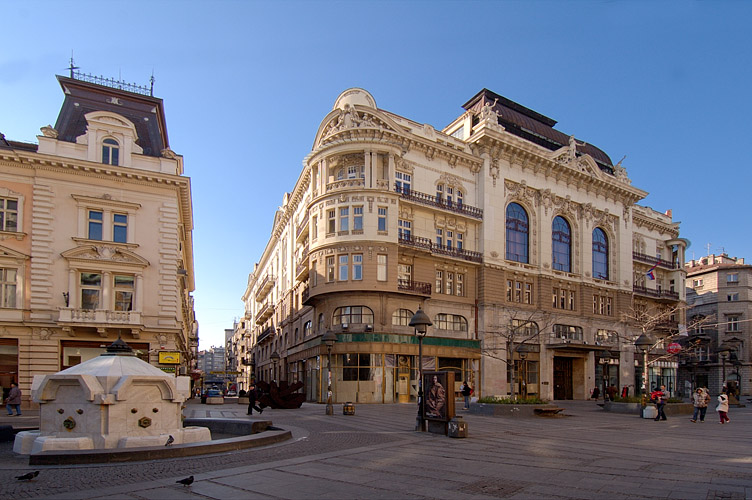
Serbian Academy of Sciences and Arts building in Belgrade, 1922

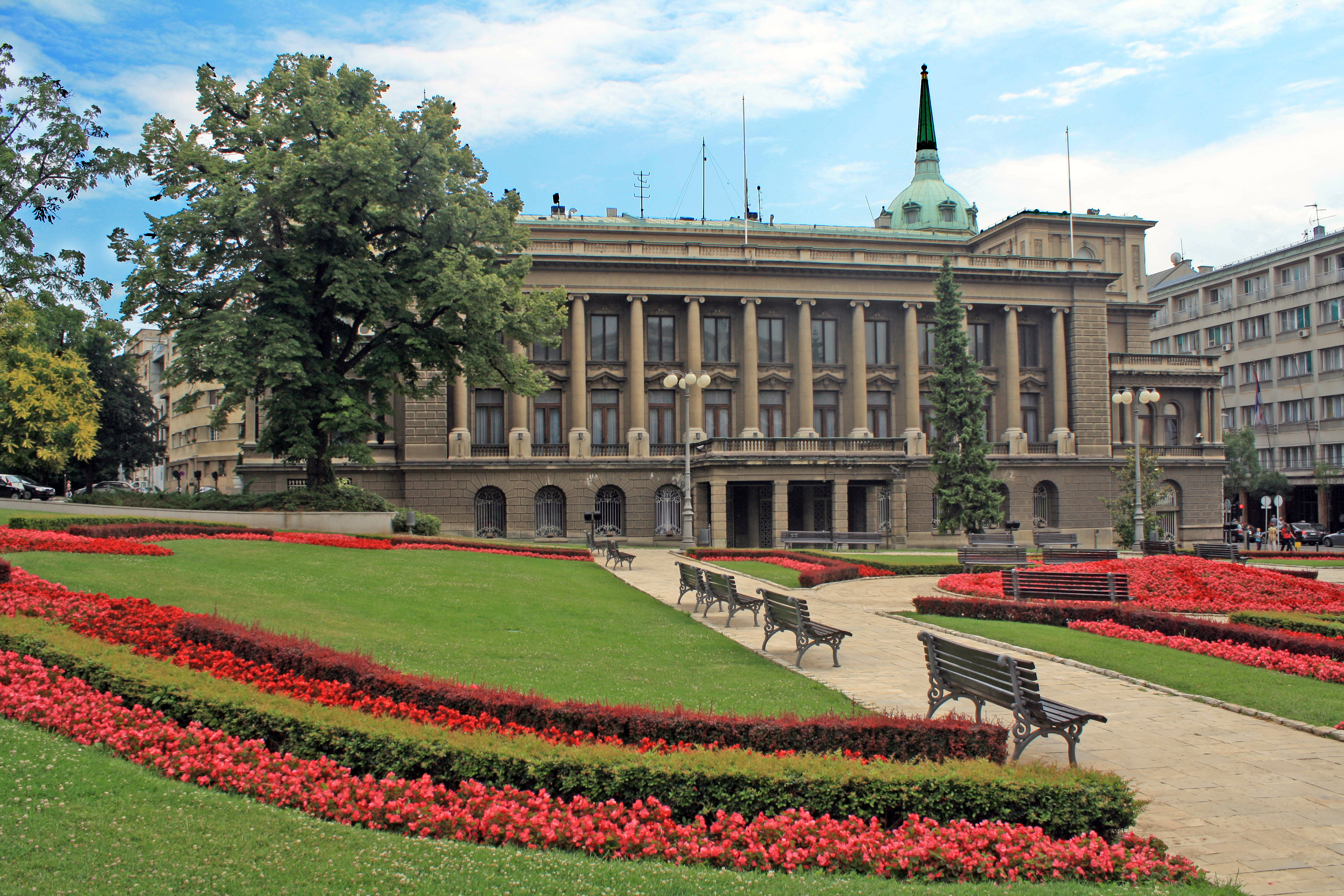
Karađorđević Palace by Stojan Titelbah and Momir Korunović in Belgrade, 1922

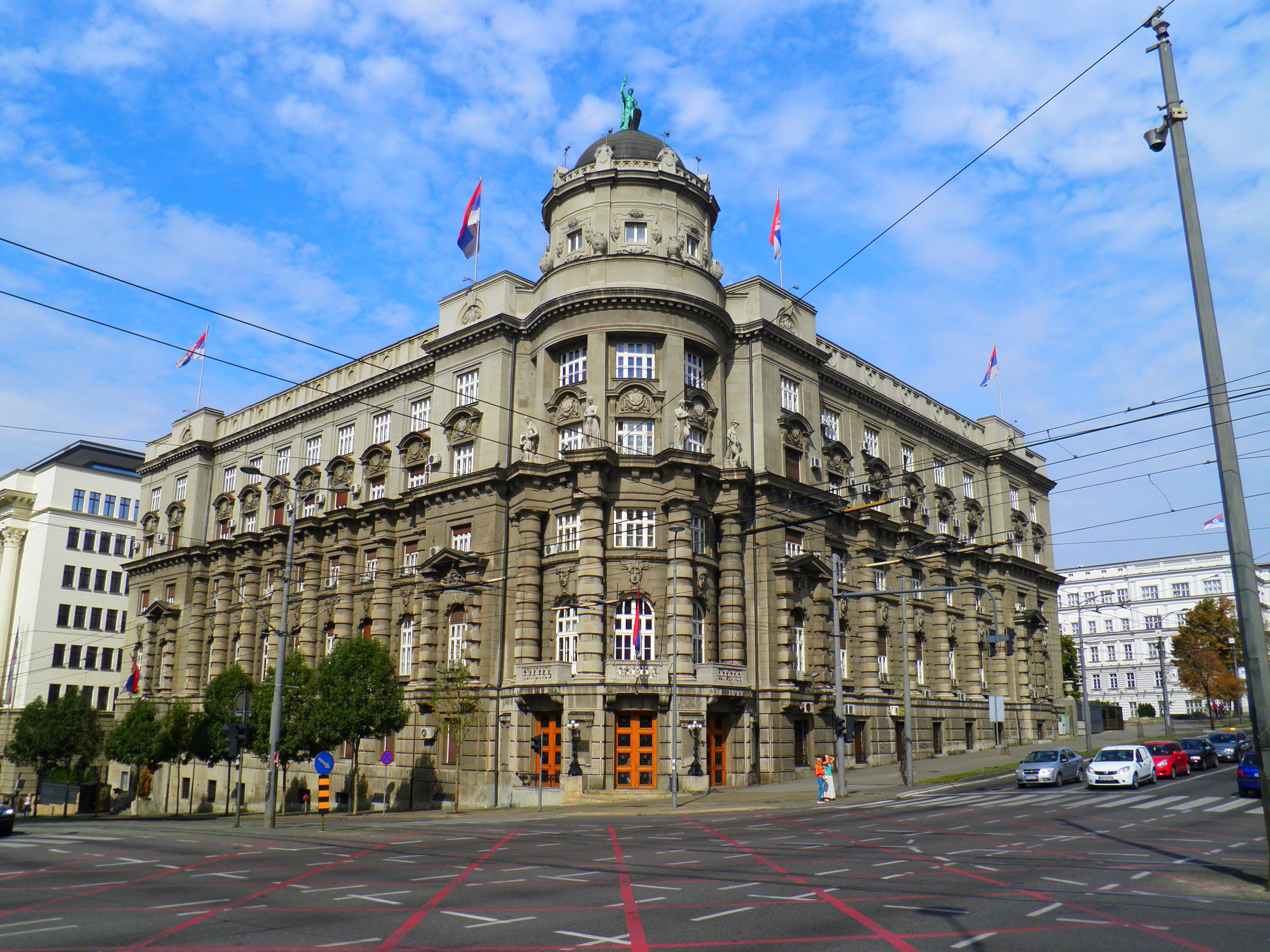
Ministry of Finance of Serbia Building by Nikolay Krasnov in Belgrade, 1926–28

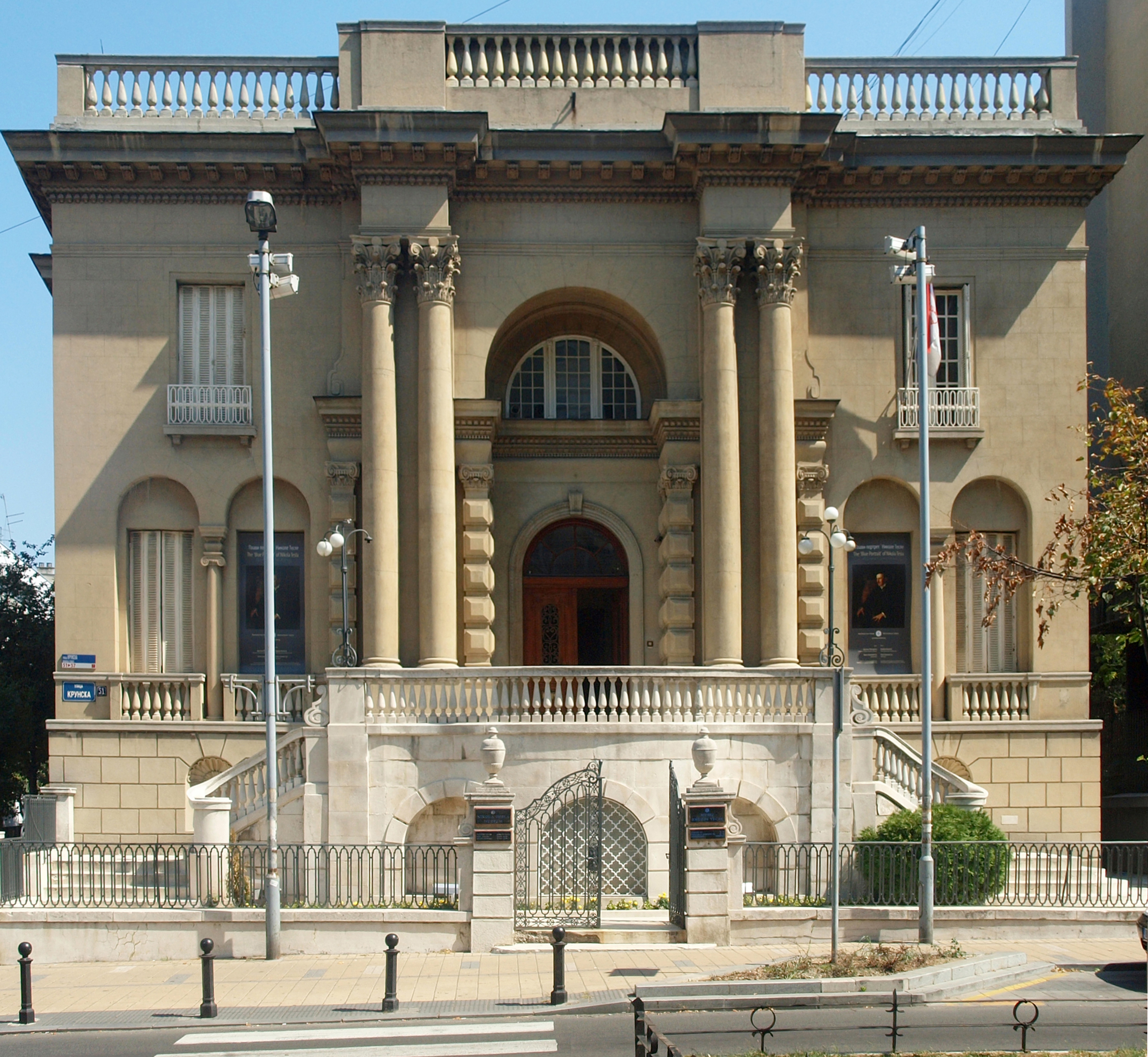
Nikola Tesla Museum by Dragiša Brašovan in Belgrade, 1927

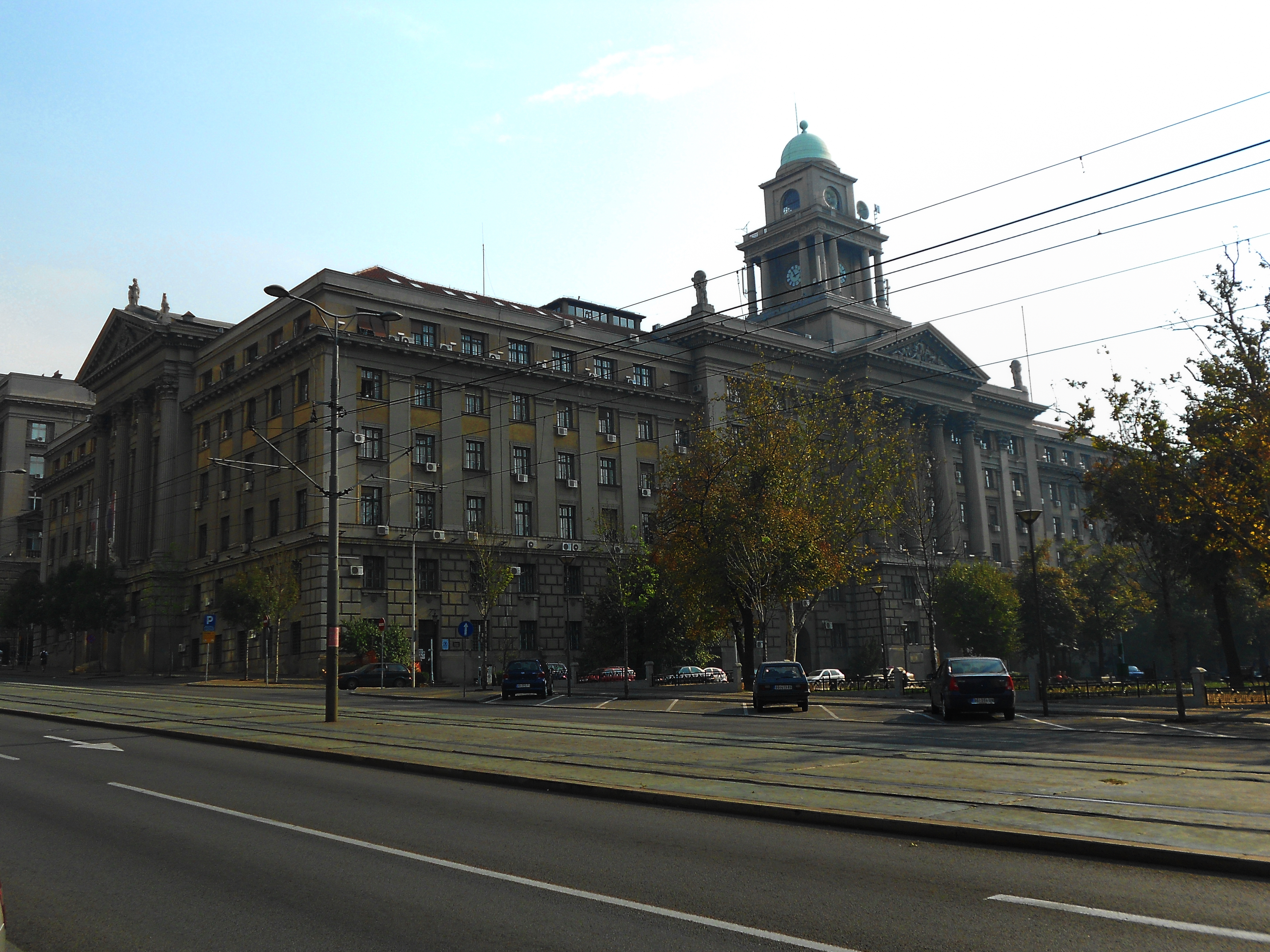
Railway Museum by Svetozar Jovanović in Belgrade, 1931

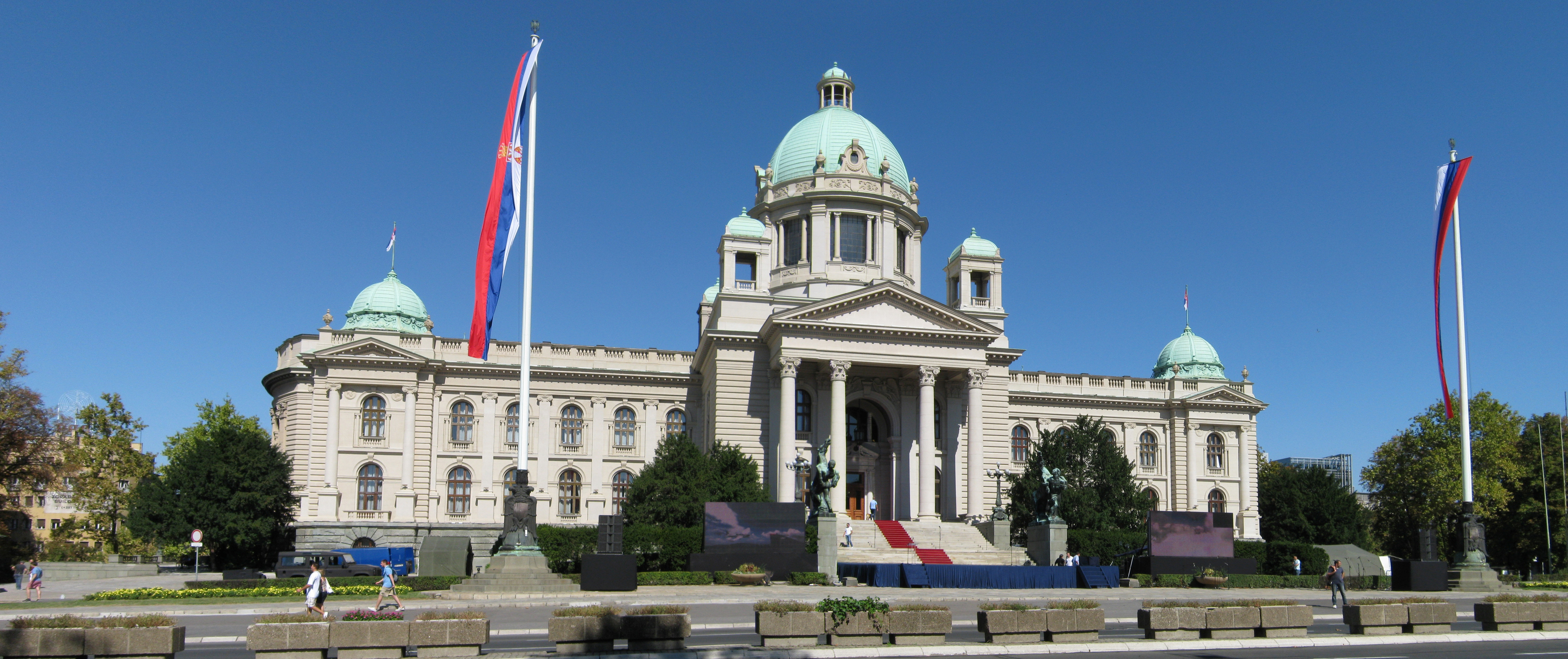
House of the National Assembly of Serbia by Konstantin Jovanović in Belgrade, 1936

=== Art Nouveau and Art Deco ===
There was a short continuation of Art Nouveau in the interwar period, mostly replaced by other modernism movements. Art Deco in Serbia was not as popular of an architectural style as Art Nouveau was. Only few buildings took design elements from the movement, with an emphasis on statues, figure and word reliefs as part of the building's design. The Embassy of France in Belgrade by Roger-Henri Expert and Josif Najman is the best example of Art Deco present in Serbia. Other examples took elements of existing modernism designs, such as Czech Cubism and Vienna Secession with the Building of the First Danube Steamboat Society (1926) in Belgrade, contributing to a more eclectic approach to Art Deco in Serbia.

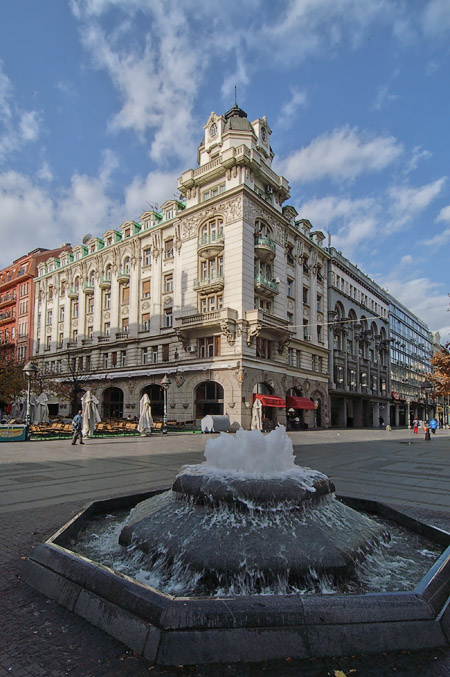
Ruski car Tavern by Petar Popović and Dragiša Brašovan in Belgrade, 1926

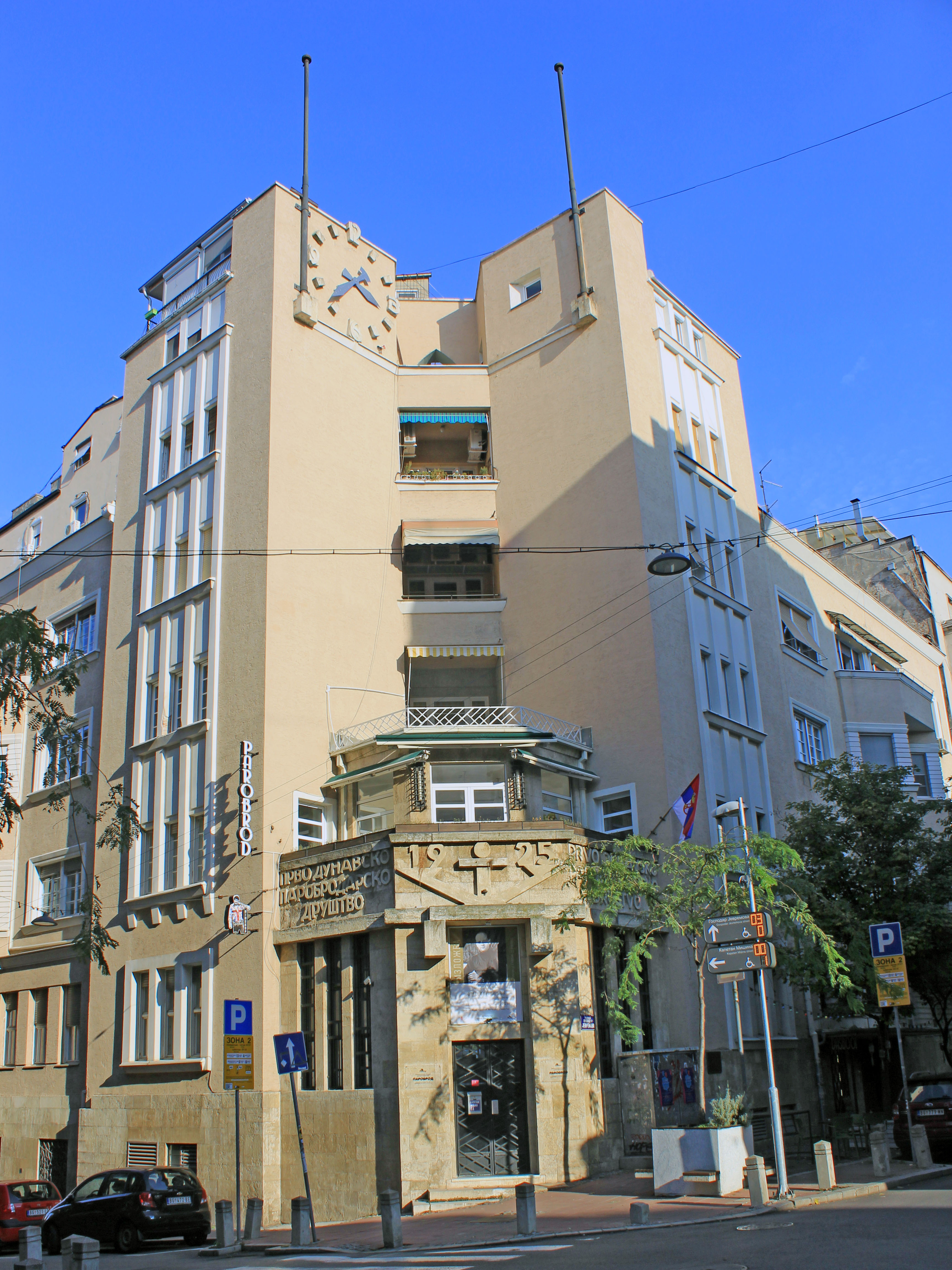
Building of the First Danube Steamboat Society by Aleksandar Pop and Stevan Tolbar in Belgrade, 1926

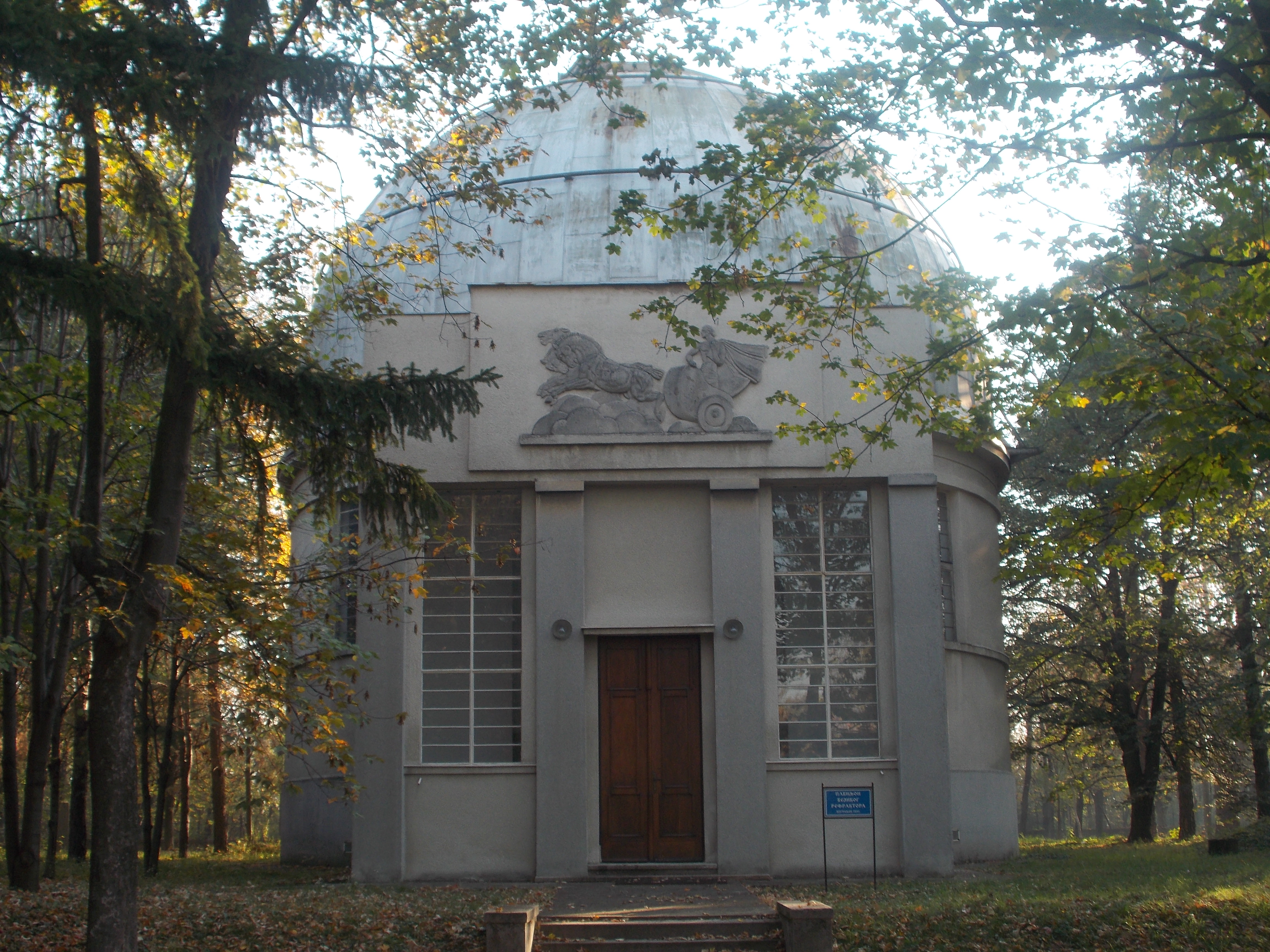
Pavilion of Large Refractor of Belgrade Observatory by Jan Dubovy, 1932

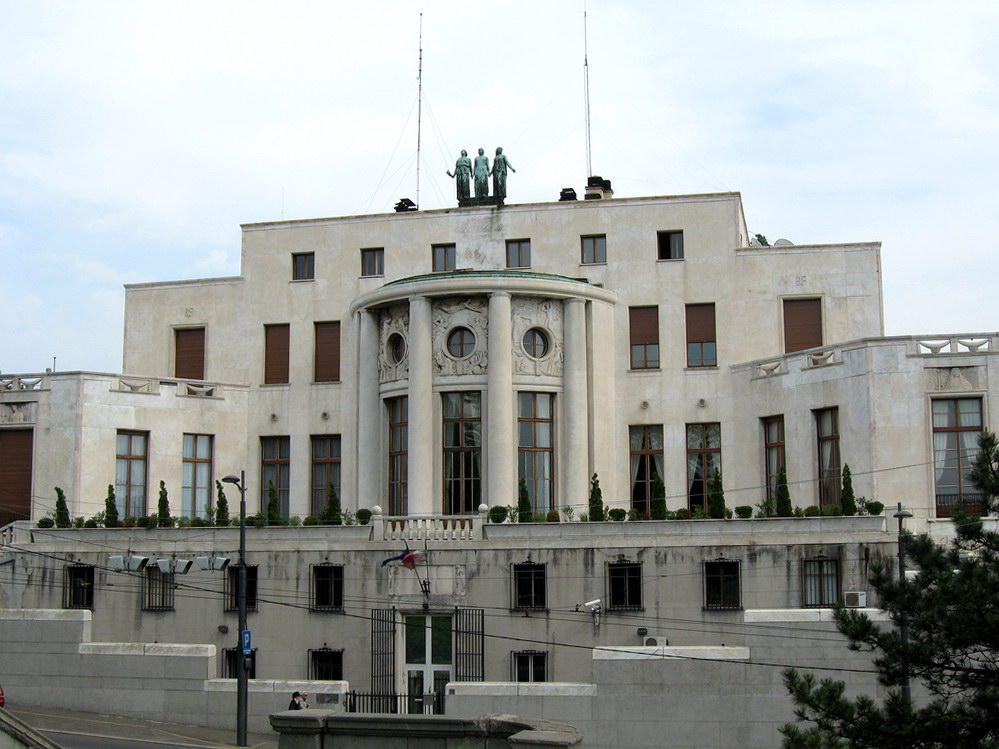
Embassy of France by Roger-Henri Expert and Josif Najman in Belgrade, 1933

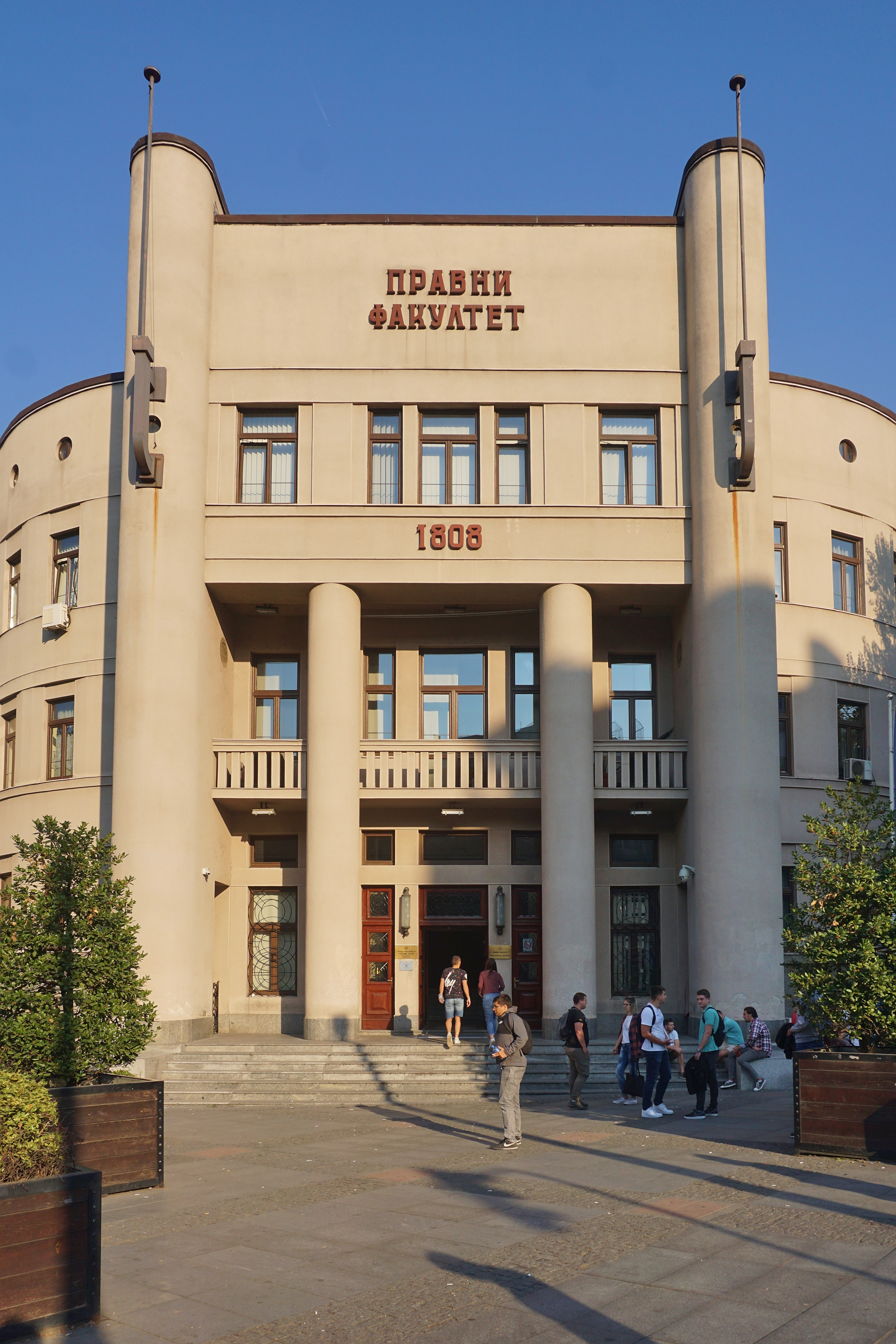
University of Belgrade Faculty of Law by Petar Bajalović, 1937

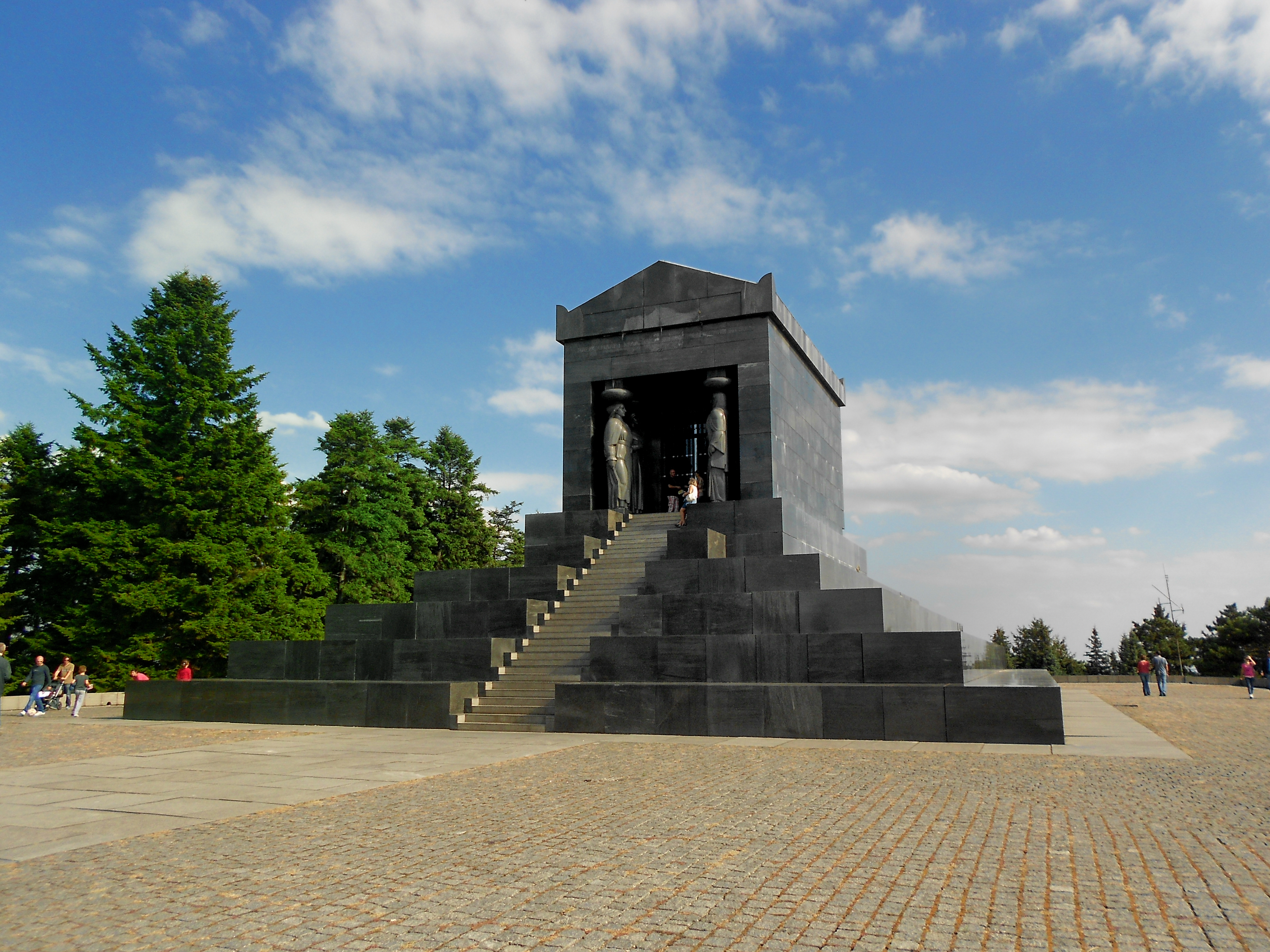
Monument to the Unknown Hero by Ivan Meštrović and Stevan Živanović in Avala, 1938

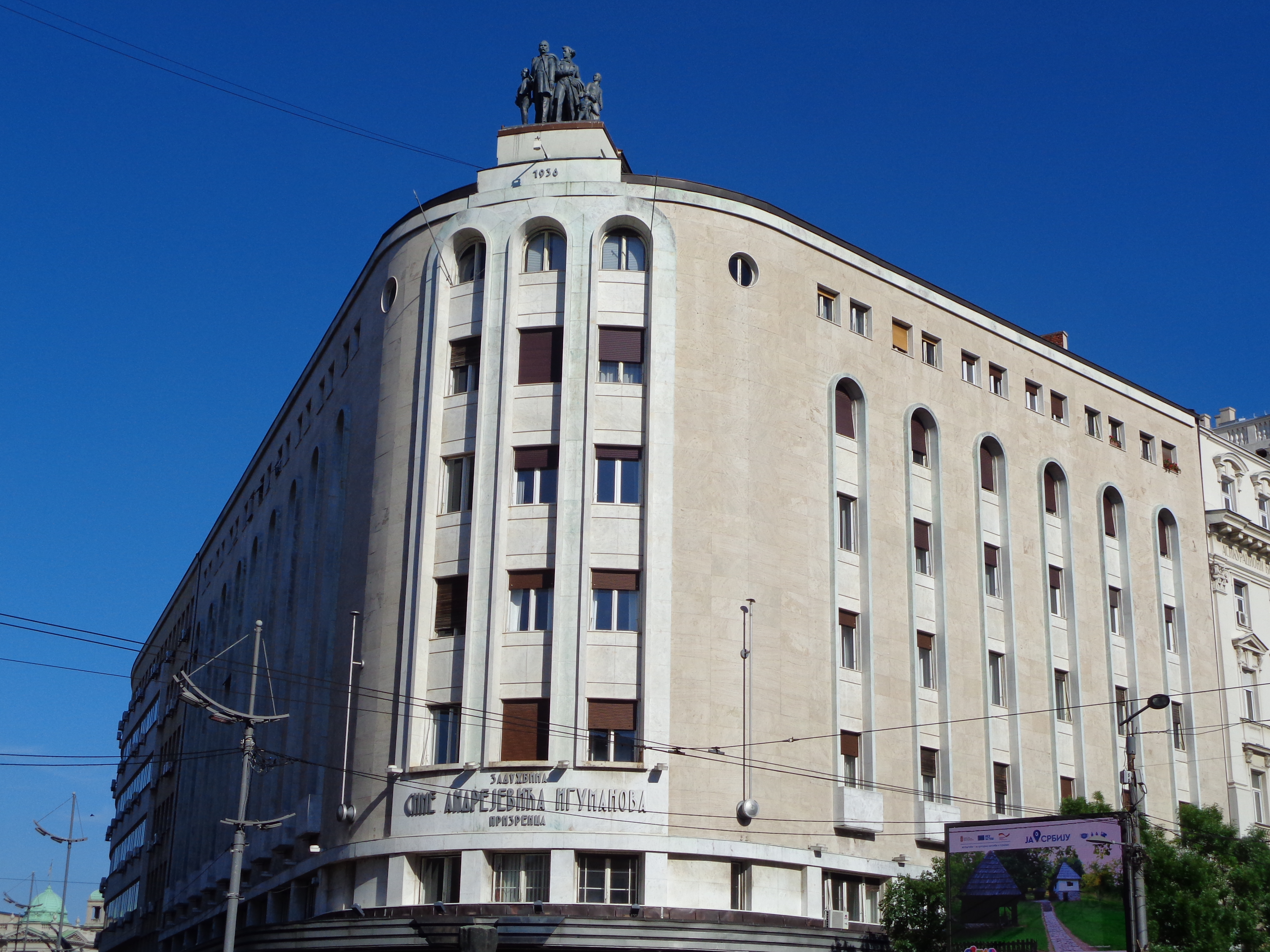
Igumanov's Palace by Lojze Dolinar, Petar and Branko Krstić in Belgrade, 1938

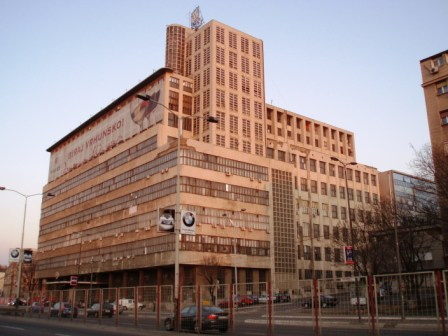
BIGZ building by Dragiša Brašovan in Belgrade, 1940

=== Interwar Modernism ===
Interwar Modernism in Serbia consists of buildings stripped from almost all decorative elements. Some were reminiscent of classicism, while others incorporated a few elements from Serbo-Byzantine Revival.

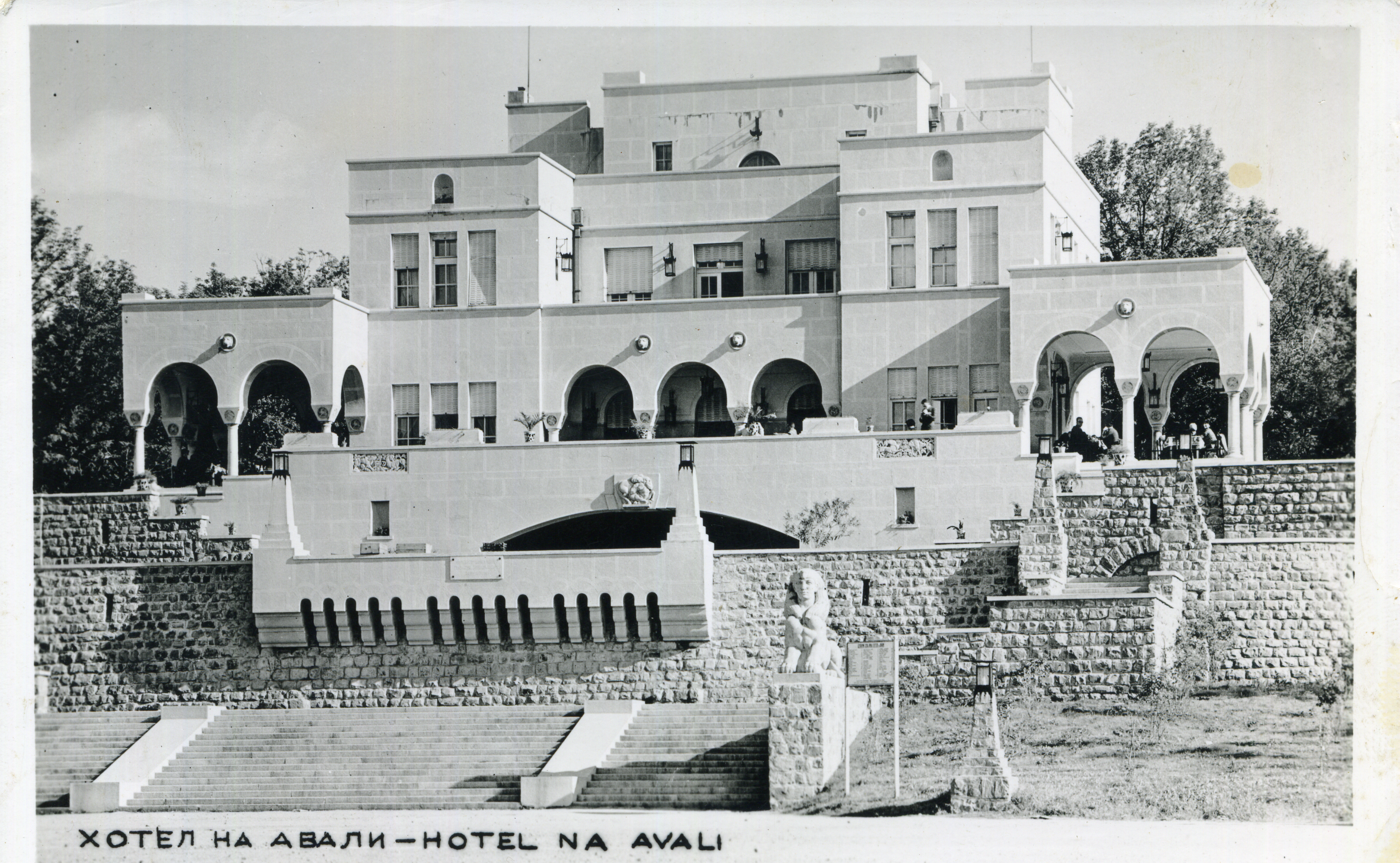
Hotel Avala by Viktor Lukomski, modernism combined with traditional architectural elements, 1928

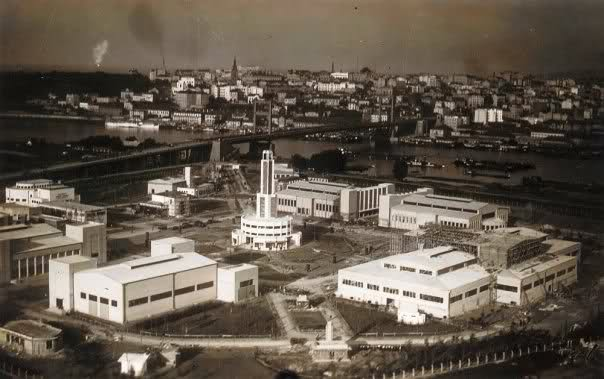
Old Fair Complex in Belgrade, 1937

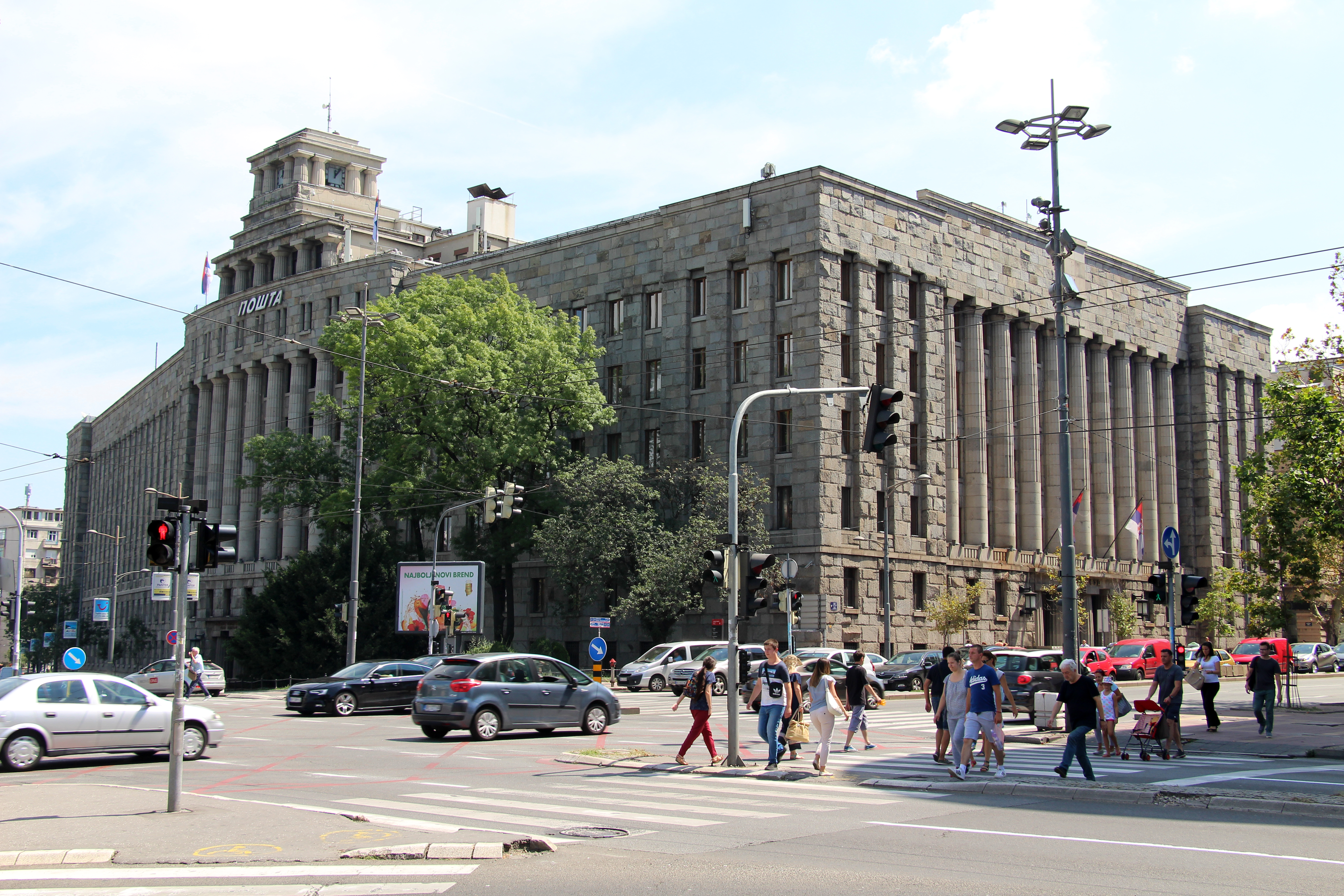
Main Post Office Palace stripped classicism by Vasilij Mihajlovič Androsov in Belgrade, 1938

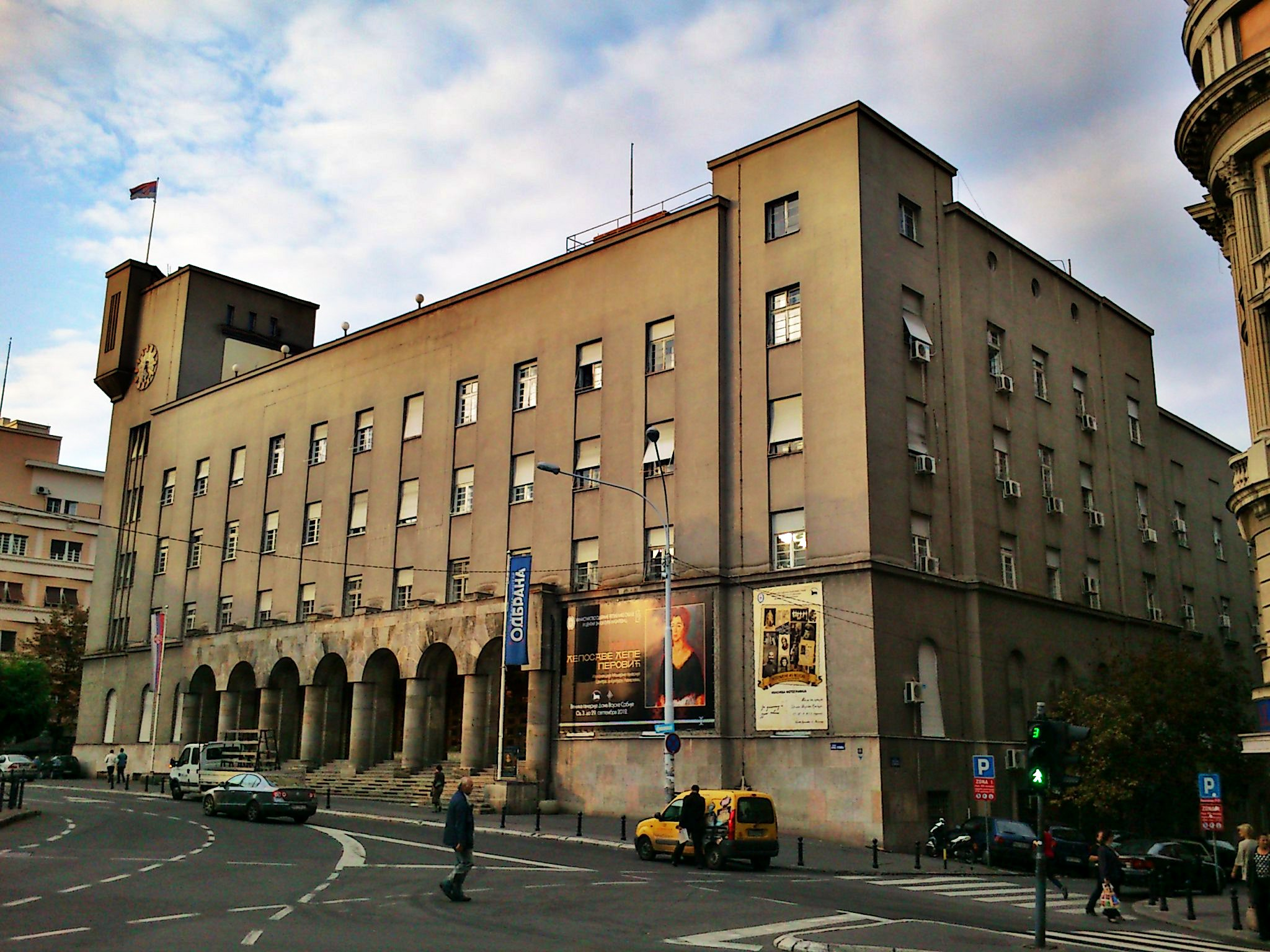
Veterans' Club Building in Belgrade, 1939

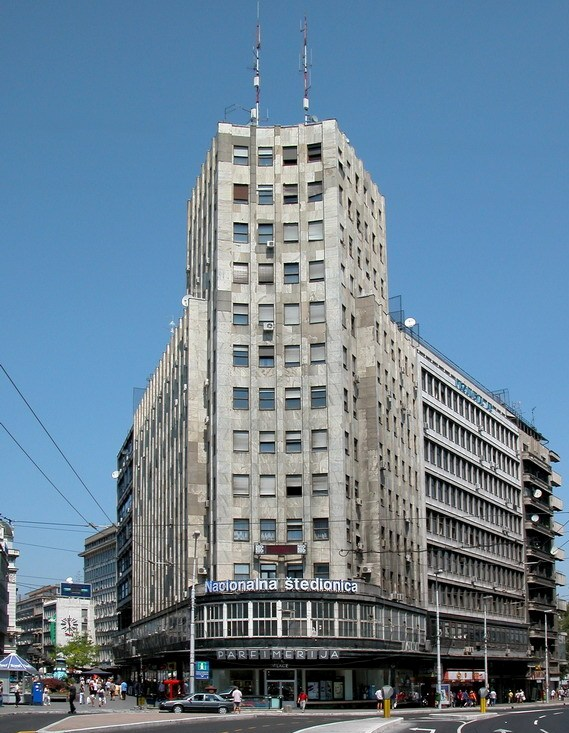
Palace Albanija, 1939, the first skyscraper in Southeast Europe

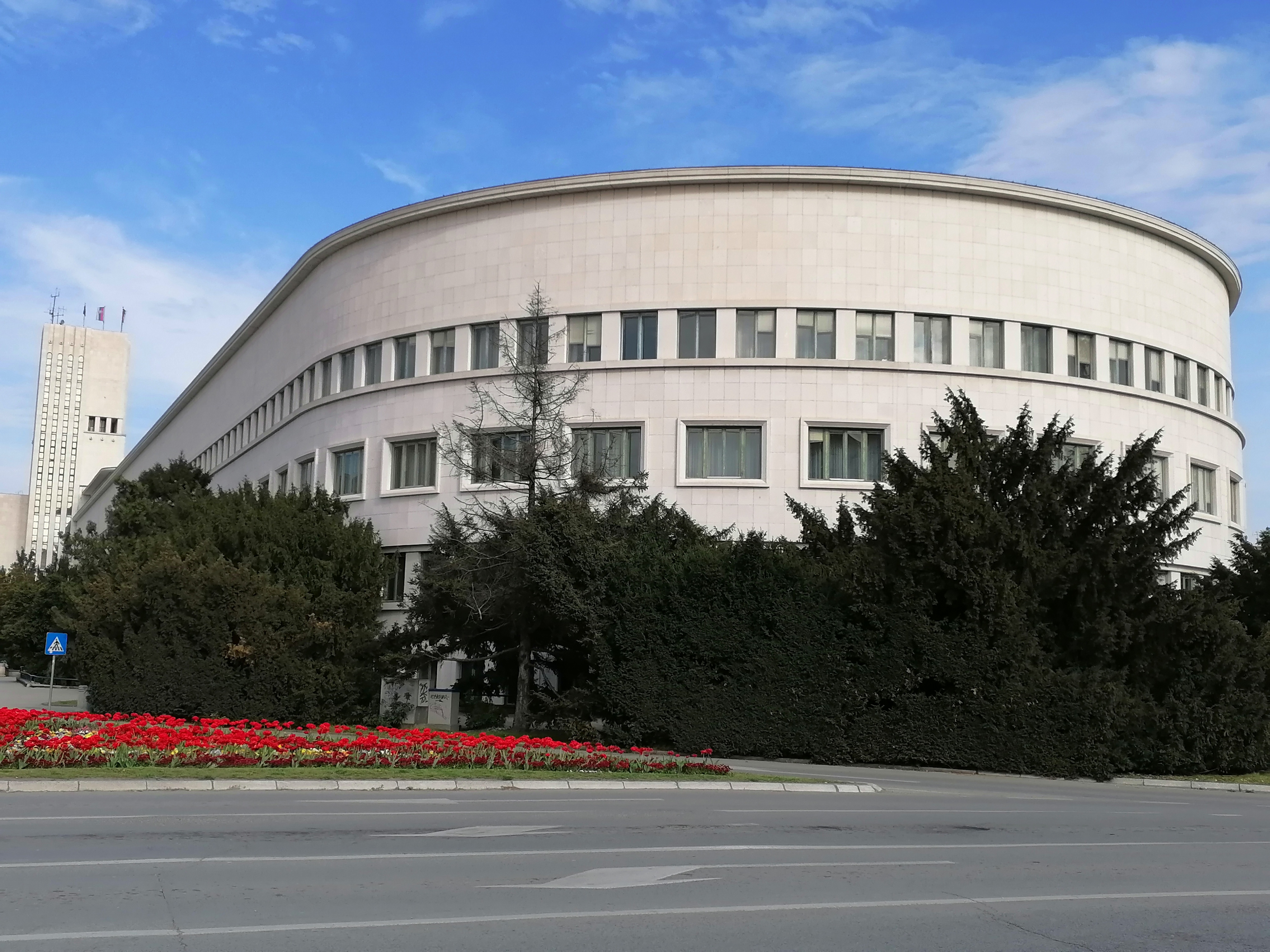
Danube Banovina Palace stripped classicism by Dragiša Brašovan in Novi Sad, 1939

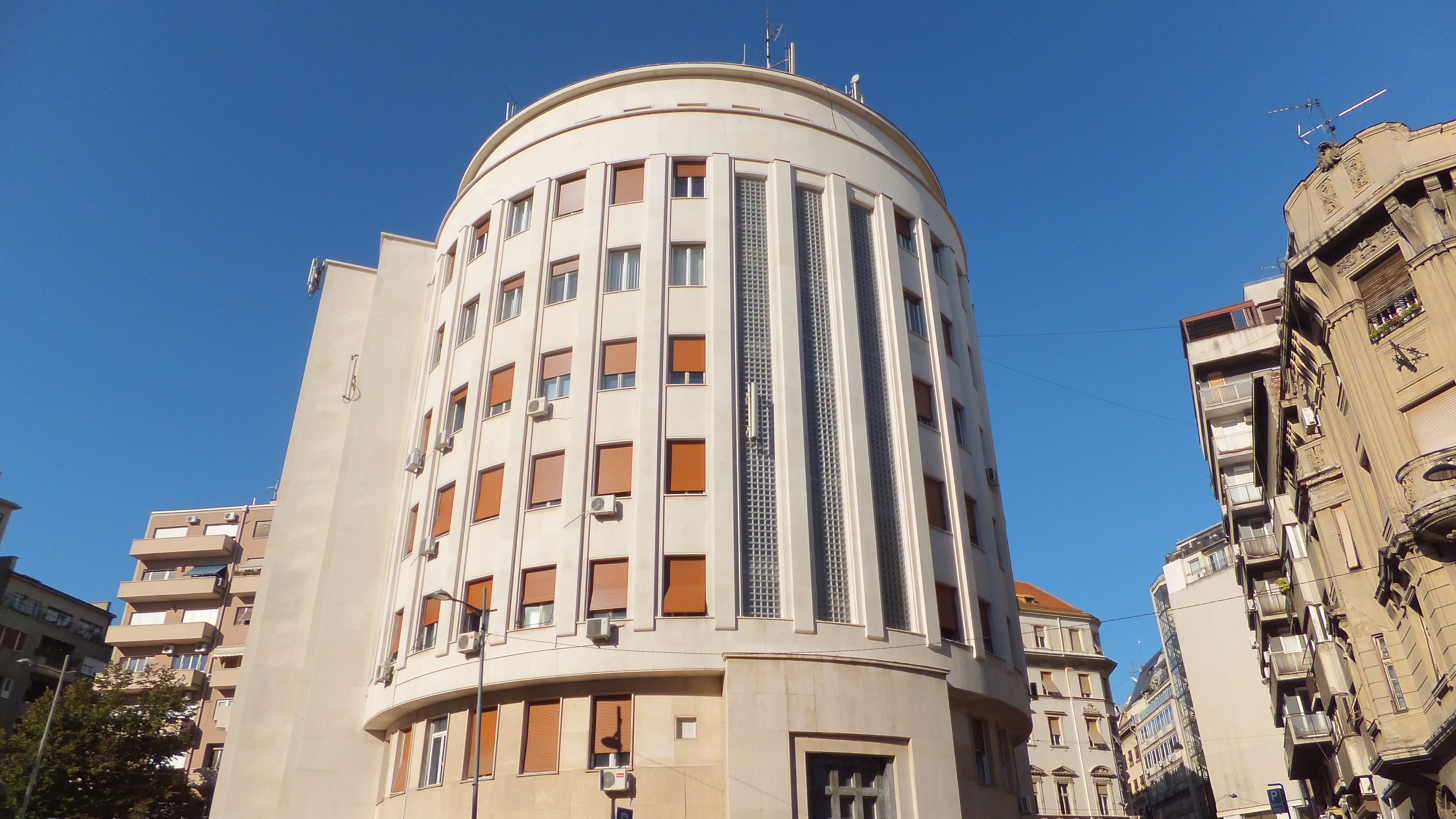
PRIZAD Building stripped classicism by Bogdan Nestorović in Belgrade, 1939

== Socialist Yugoslav period ==
The architecture of Yugoslavia was characterized by emerging, unique, and often differing national and regional narratives. As a socialist state remaining free from the Iron Curtain, Yugoslavia adopted a hybrid identity that combined the architectural, cultural, and political leanings of both Western liberal democracy and Soviet communism.

=== Socialist Realism (1945–1948) ===
Immediately following the Second World War, Yugoslavia's brief association with the Eastern Bloc ushered in a short period of socialist realism, specifically in building architecture. Centralization within the communist model led to the abolishment of private architectural practices and the state control of the profession. During this period, the governing Communist Party condemned modernism as "bourgeois formalism," a move that caused friction among the nation's pre-war modernist architectural elite. Dom Sindikata built in 1947 is one of very few examples of socialist realism in building architecture. The movement would however persist in a large amount of World War II memorials and monuments, known as spomenik, despite the Yugoslav-Soviet split in 1948.

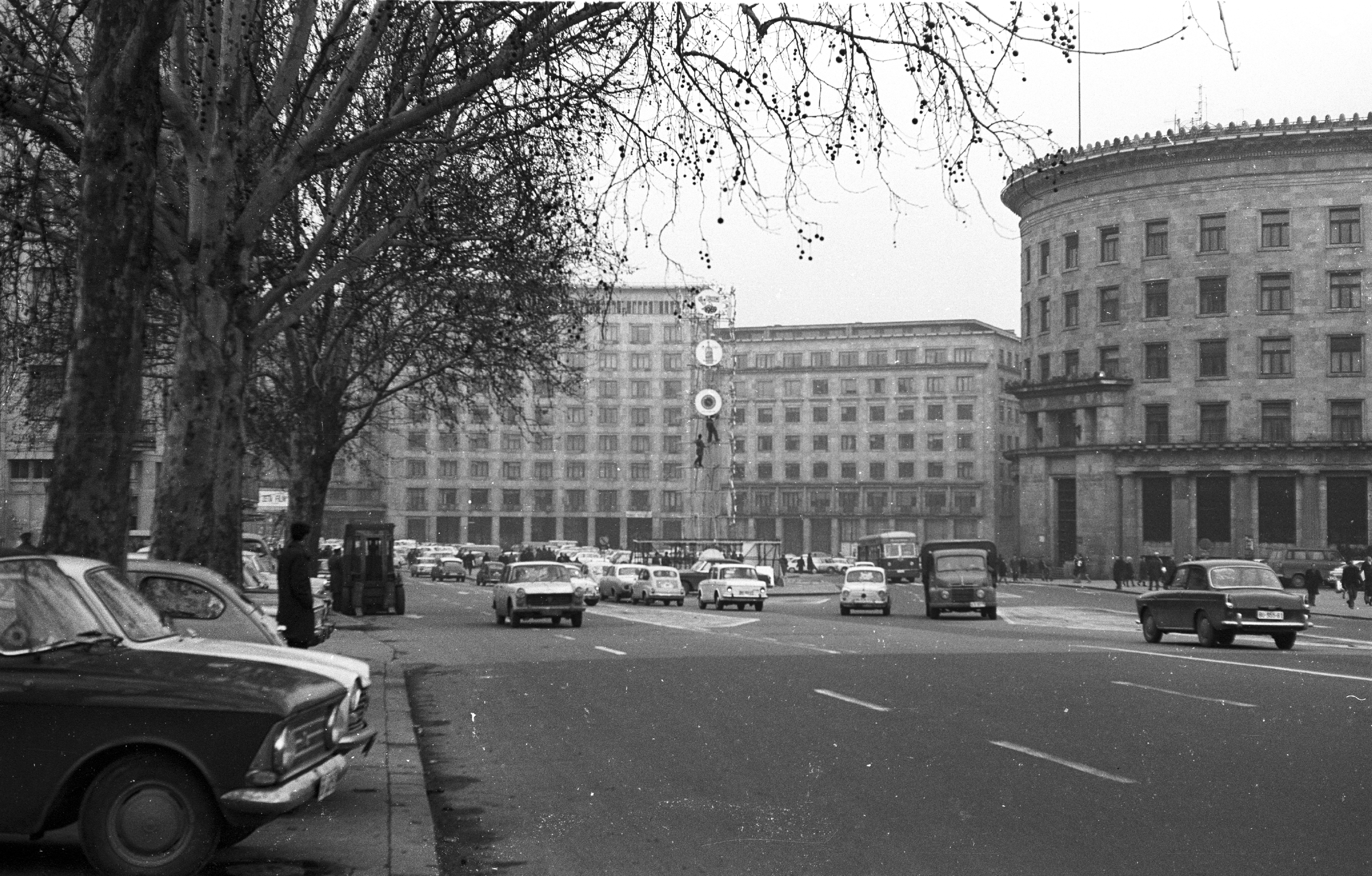
Dom Sindikata by Branko Petričić in Belgrade, 1947

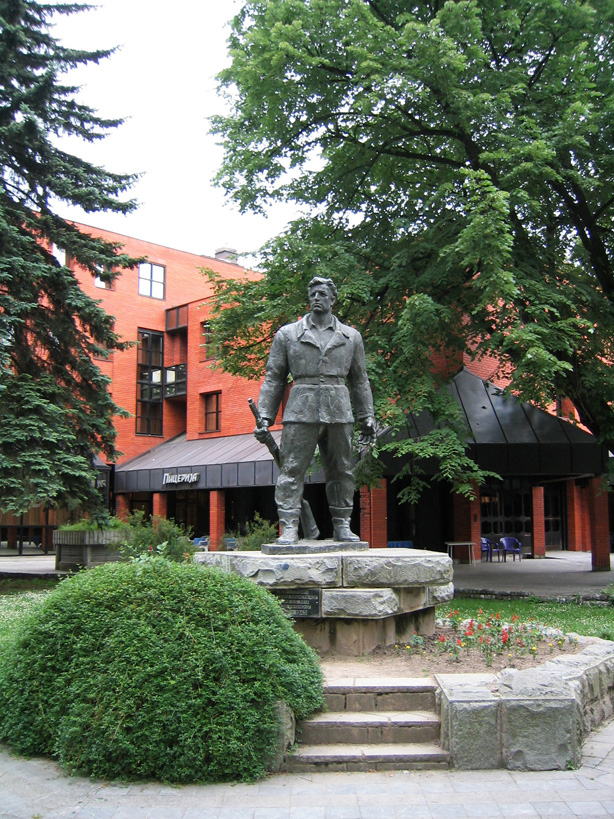
Monument to fallen fighters by Stevan Bodnarov in Bajina Bašta, 1952

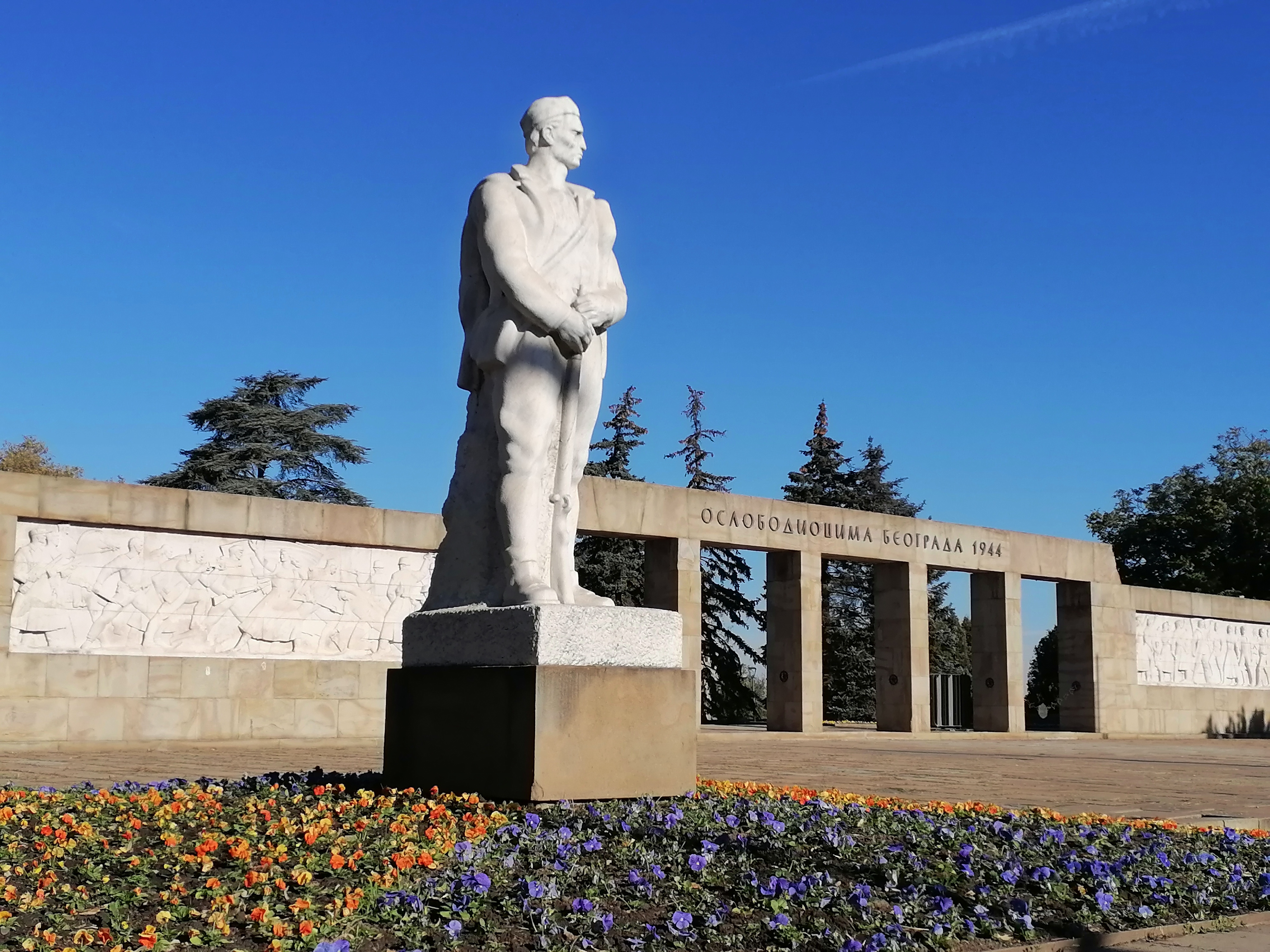
Memorial cemetery of the Liberators of Belgrade in 1944 by Branko Bon and Radeta Stanković, 1954

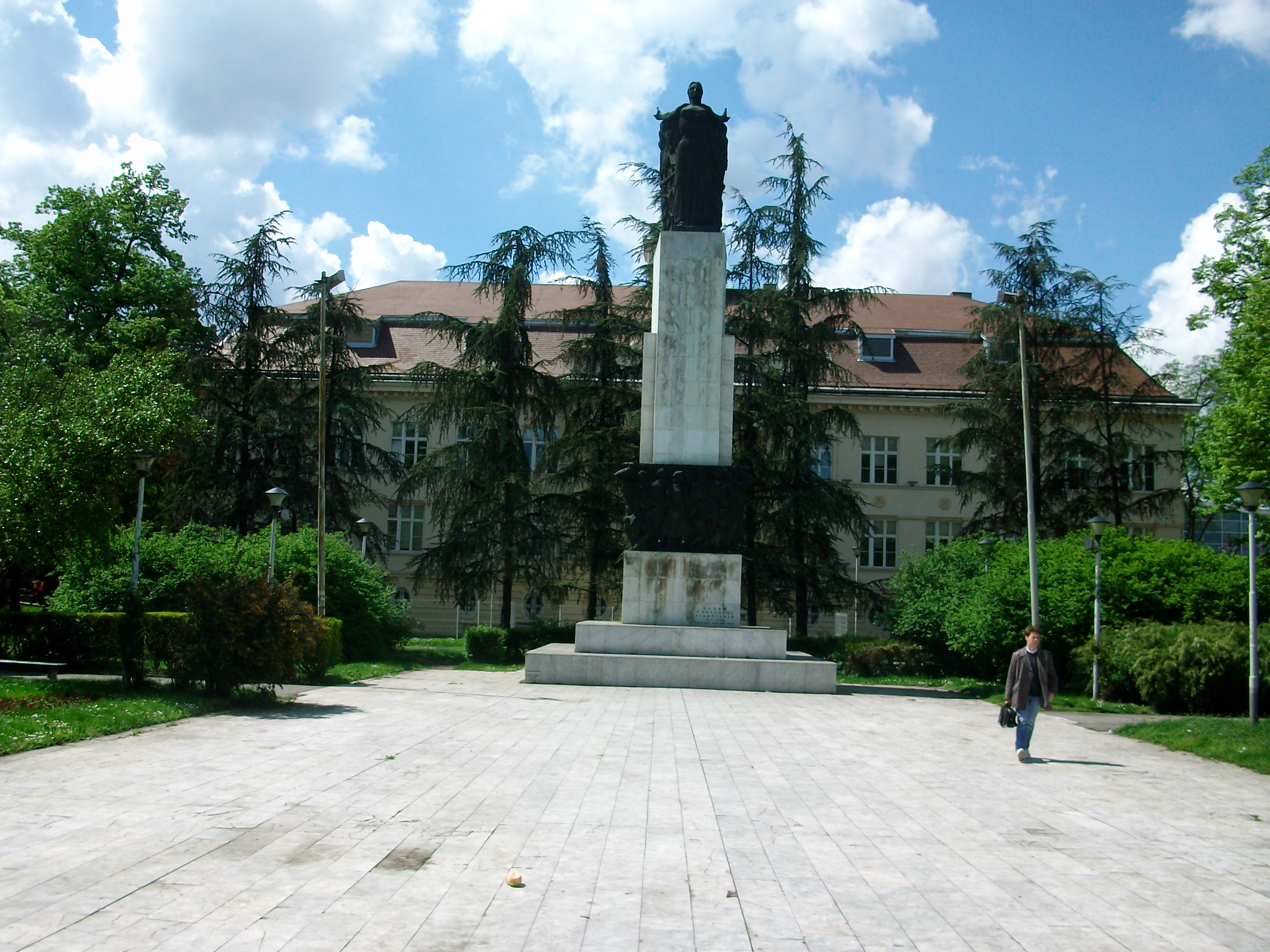
Monument to the fallen from the People's Revolution 1941–1945 by Jovan Kratohvil in Zemun, Belgrade, 1954

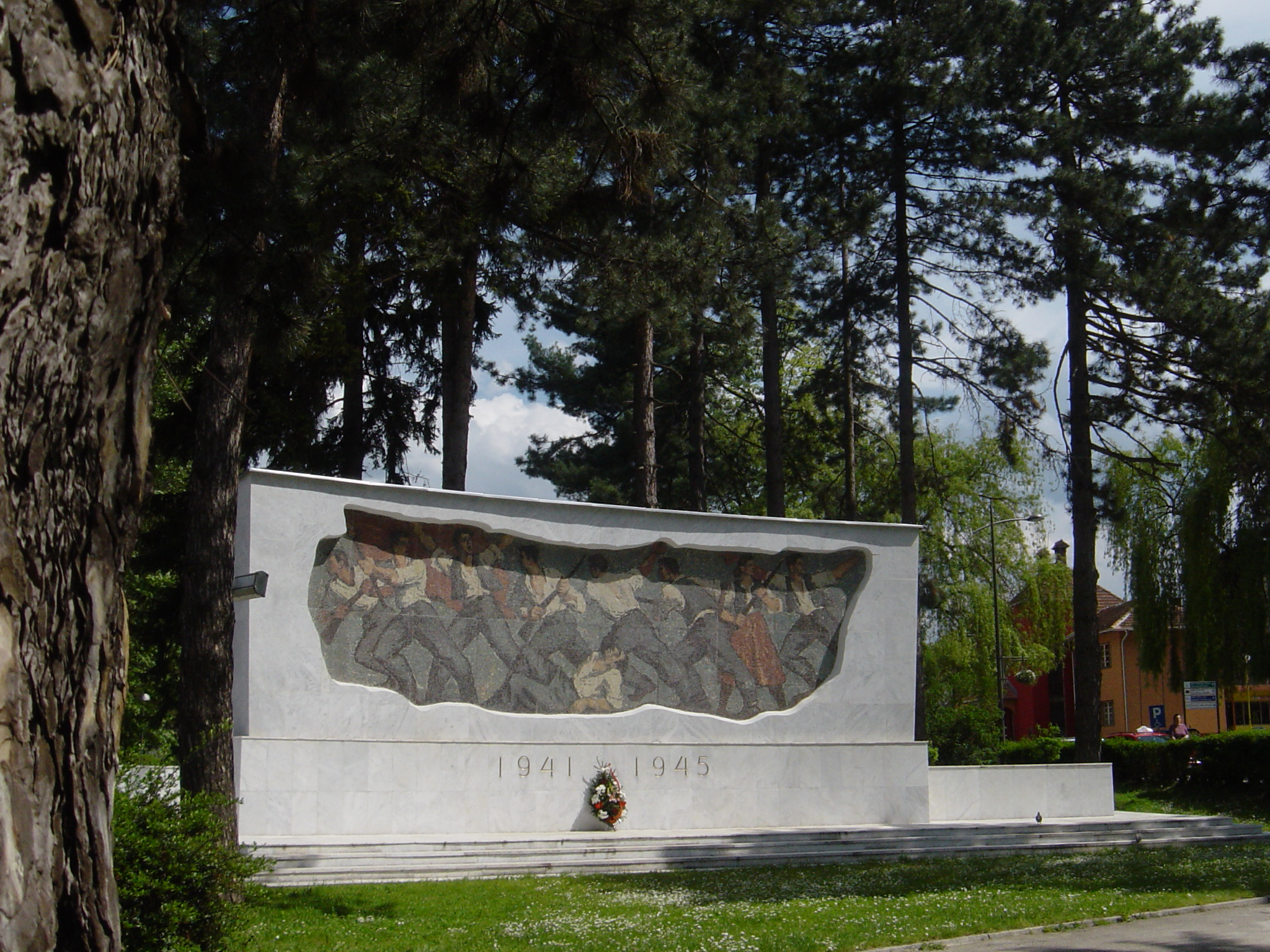
Monument to the Revolution by Đorđe Andrejević-Kun in Ivanjica, 1957

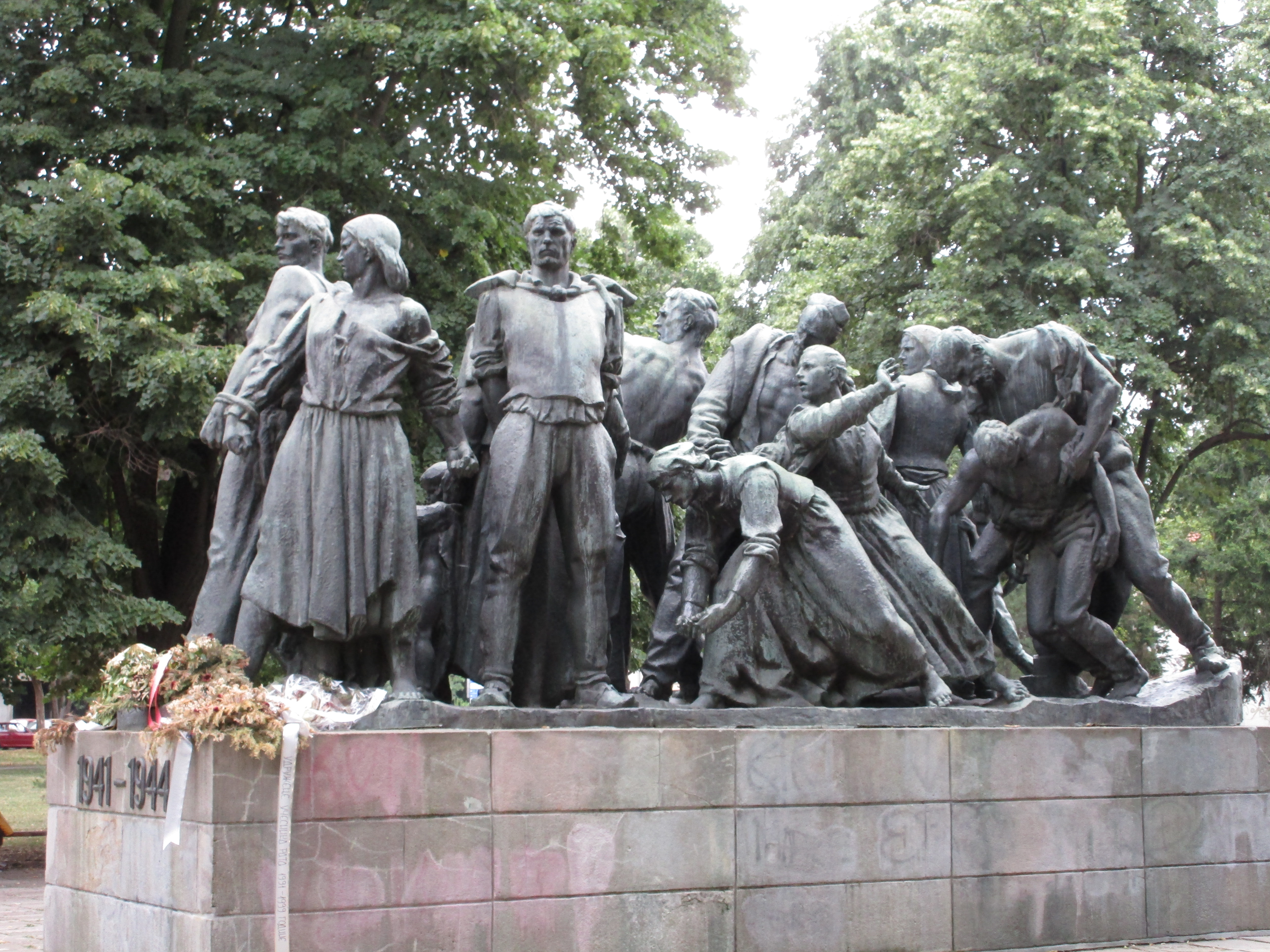
Monument of Resistance and the Fallen by Lojze Dolinar in Kraljevo, 1959

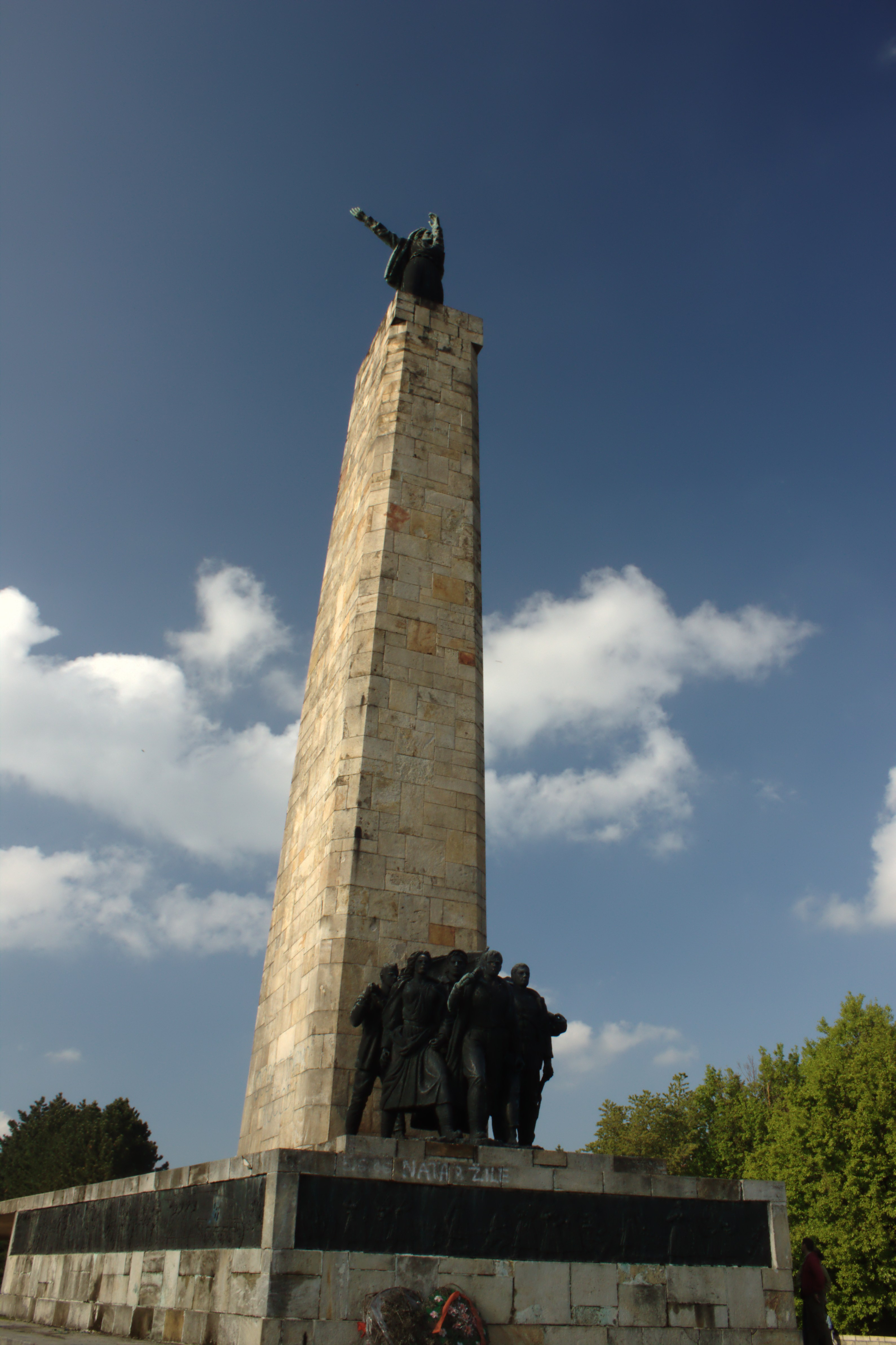
“Freedom” Monument by Sreten Stojanović in Iriški Venac, Fruška Gora, 1961

=== Modernism (1948–1992) ===
Socialist realist architecture in Yugoslavia came to an abrupt end with Josip Broz Tito's 1948 split with Stalin. In the following years the nation turned increasingly to the West, returning to the modernism that had characterized pre-war Yugoslav architecture. During this era, modernist architecture came to symbolize the nation's break from the USSR (a notion that later diminished with growing acceptability of modernism in the Eastern Bloc). The nation's postwar return to modernism is perhaps best exemplified in Vjenceslav Richter's widely acclaimed 1958 Yugoslavia Pavilion at Expo 58, the open and light nature of which contrasted the much heavier architecture of the Soviet Union. A number of architects from Serbia made important modernistic buildings across Africa and Middle East. Architect Mihajllo Mitrović was one of the several notable authors from the period. He is best known for modernistic buildings inspired by Art-Nouveau and Western City Gate. This period is marked with breakthrough modernistic designs, some of which still hold international records to this day for their construction and architectural achievements.

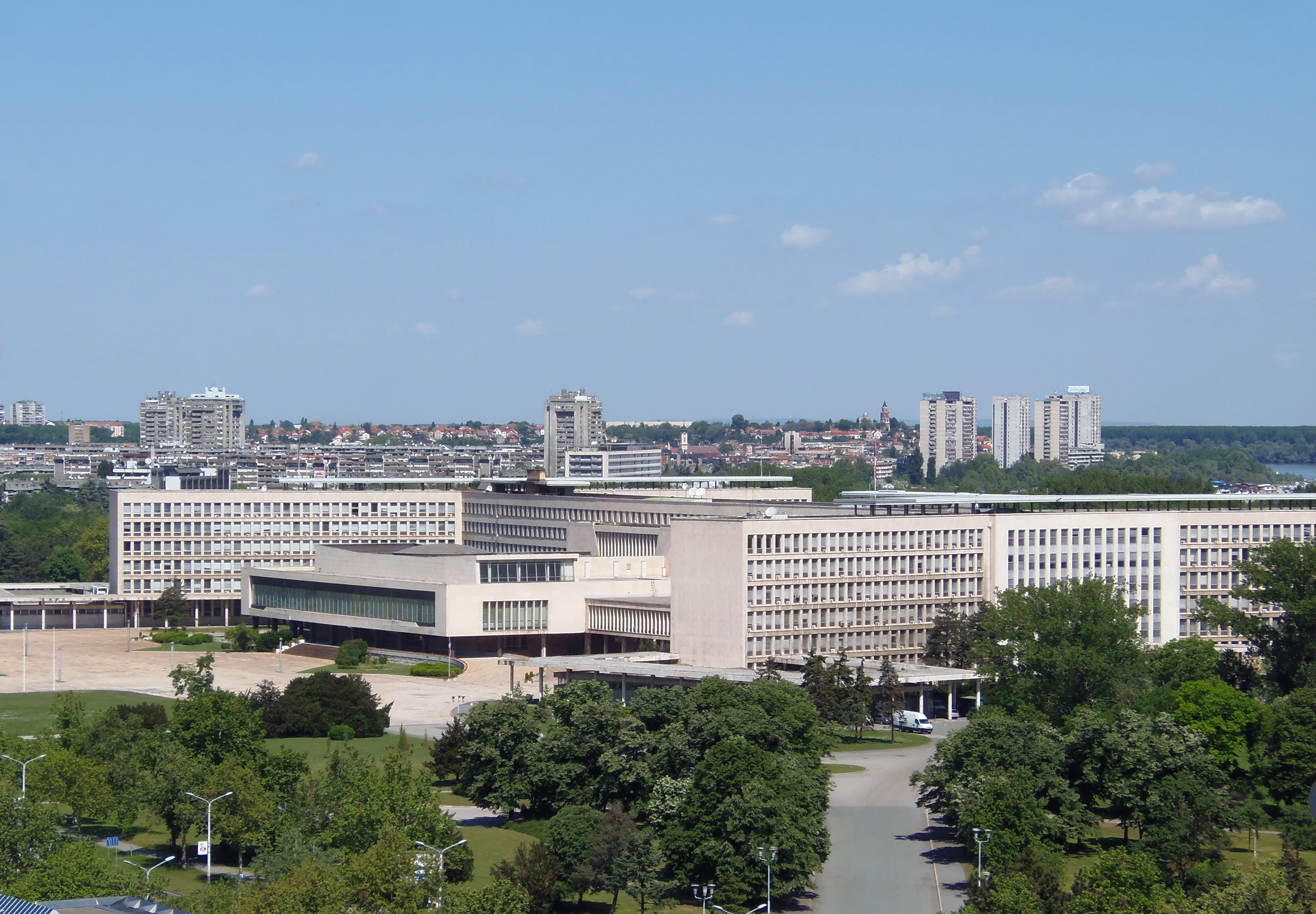
Palace of Serbia by Potočnjak and Janković in Belgrade, 1950

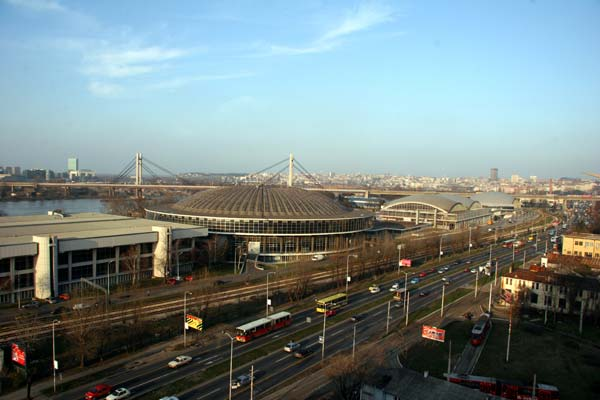
Belgrade Fair by Milorad Pantović and Branko Žeželj, 1957

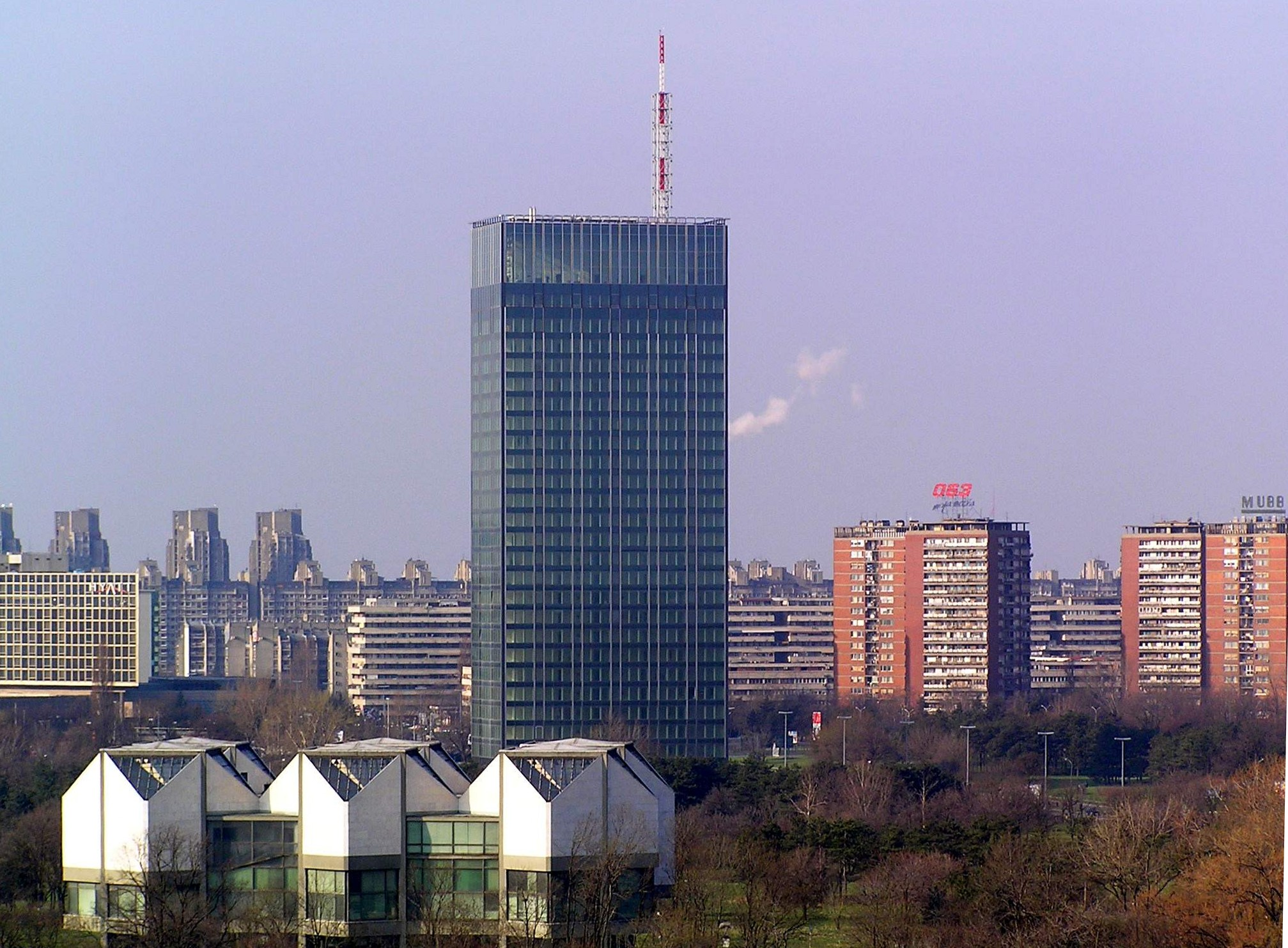
Ušće Towers, 1964 and Museum of Contemporary Art (bottom left), 1958

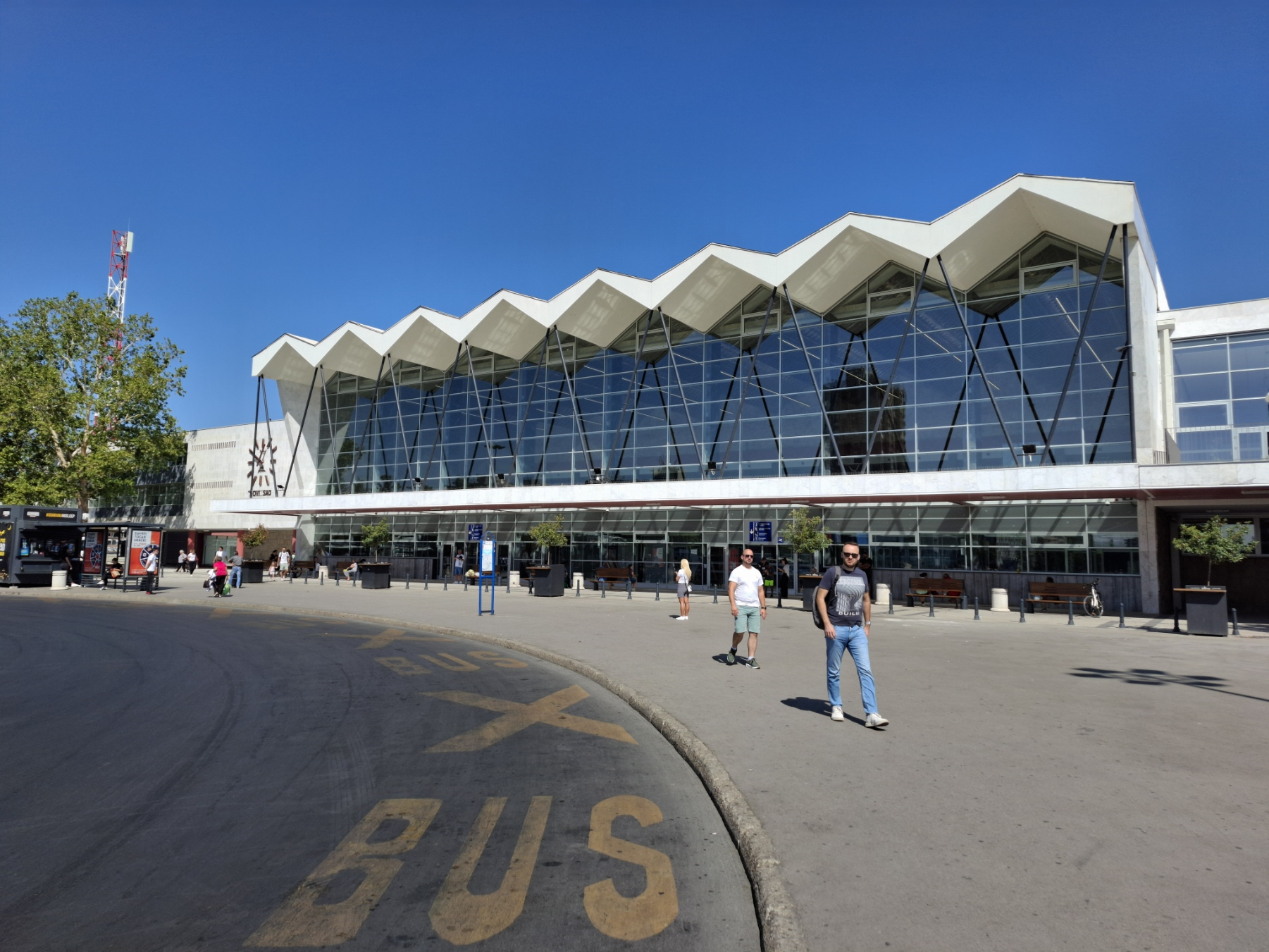
Novi Sad railway station by Imre Farkas and Milan Matović, 1964

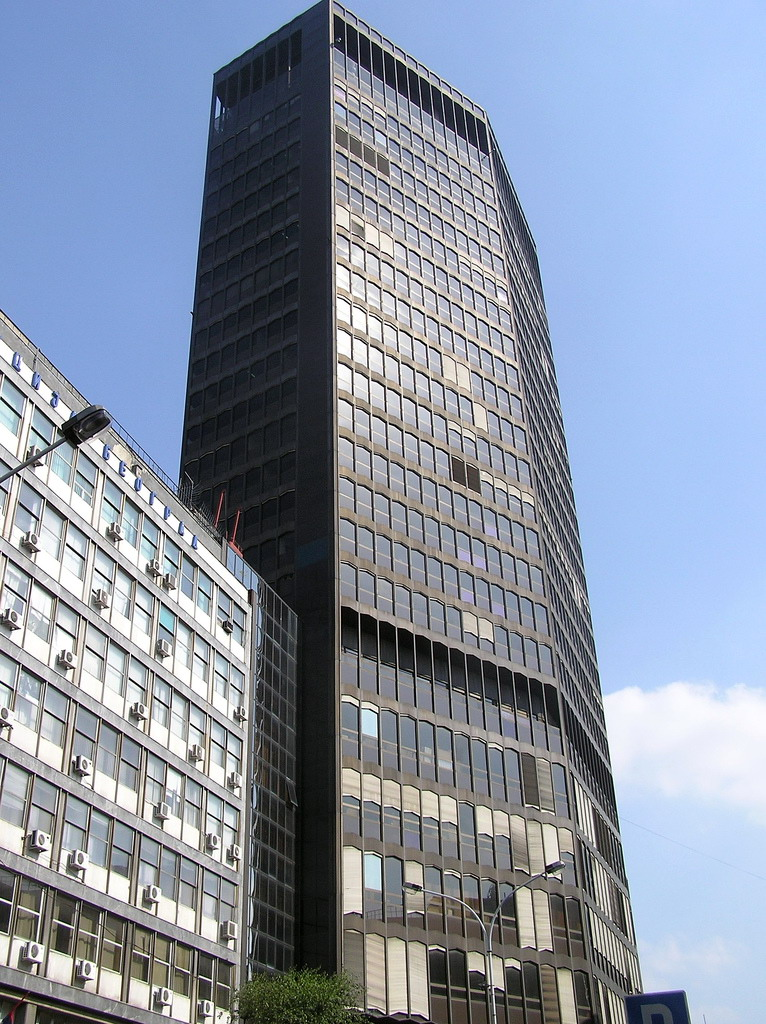
Beograđanka Tower by Branko Pešić, 1974

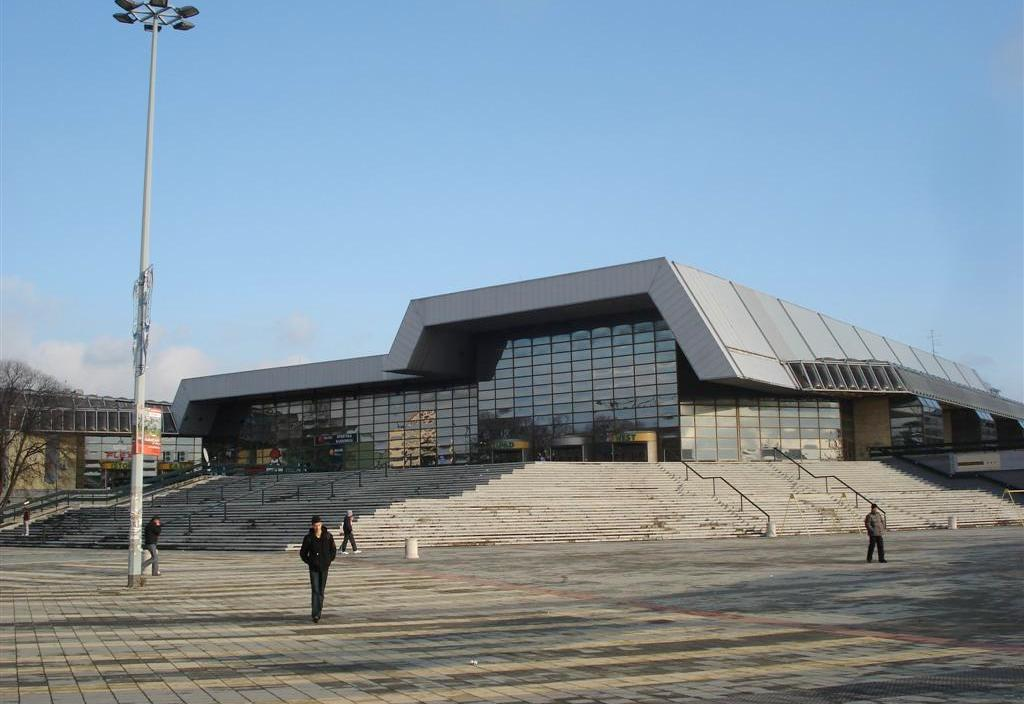
SPC Vojvodina by Živorad Janković, Branko Bulić and Duško Bogunović in Novi Sad, 1981

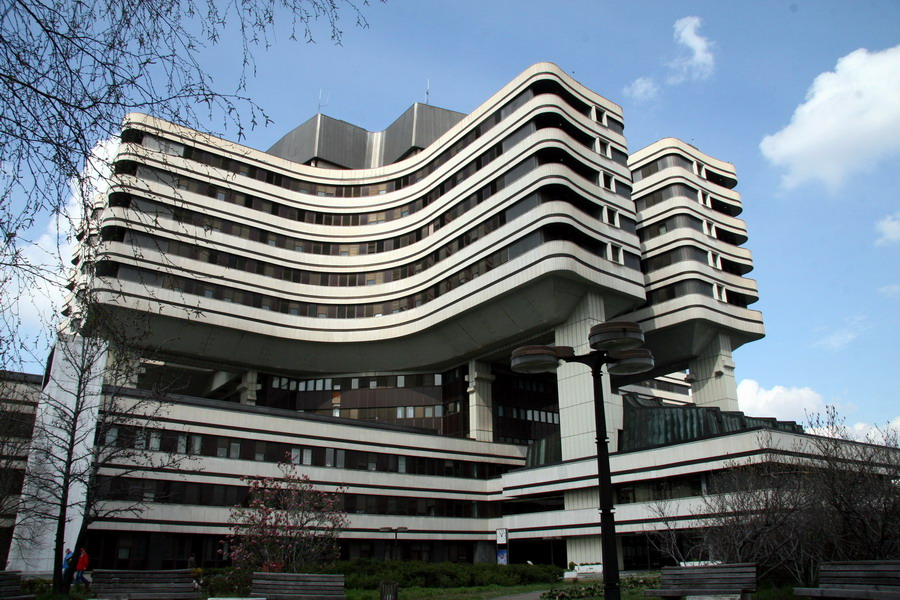
Military Medical Academy by Josip Osojnik and Slobodan Nikolić in Belgrade, 1981

=== Monuments in Serbia ===
During this period, the Yugoslav break from Soviet socialist realism combined with efforts to commemorate World War II, which together led to the creation of an immense quantity of abstract sculptural war memorials, known today as spomenik

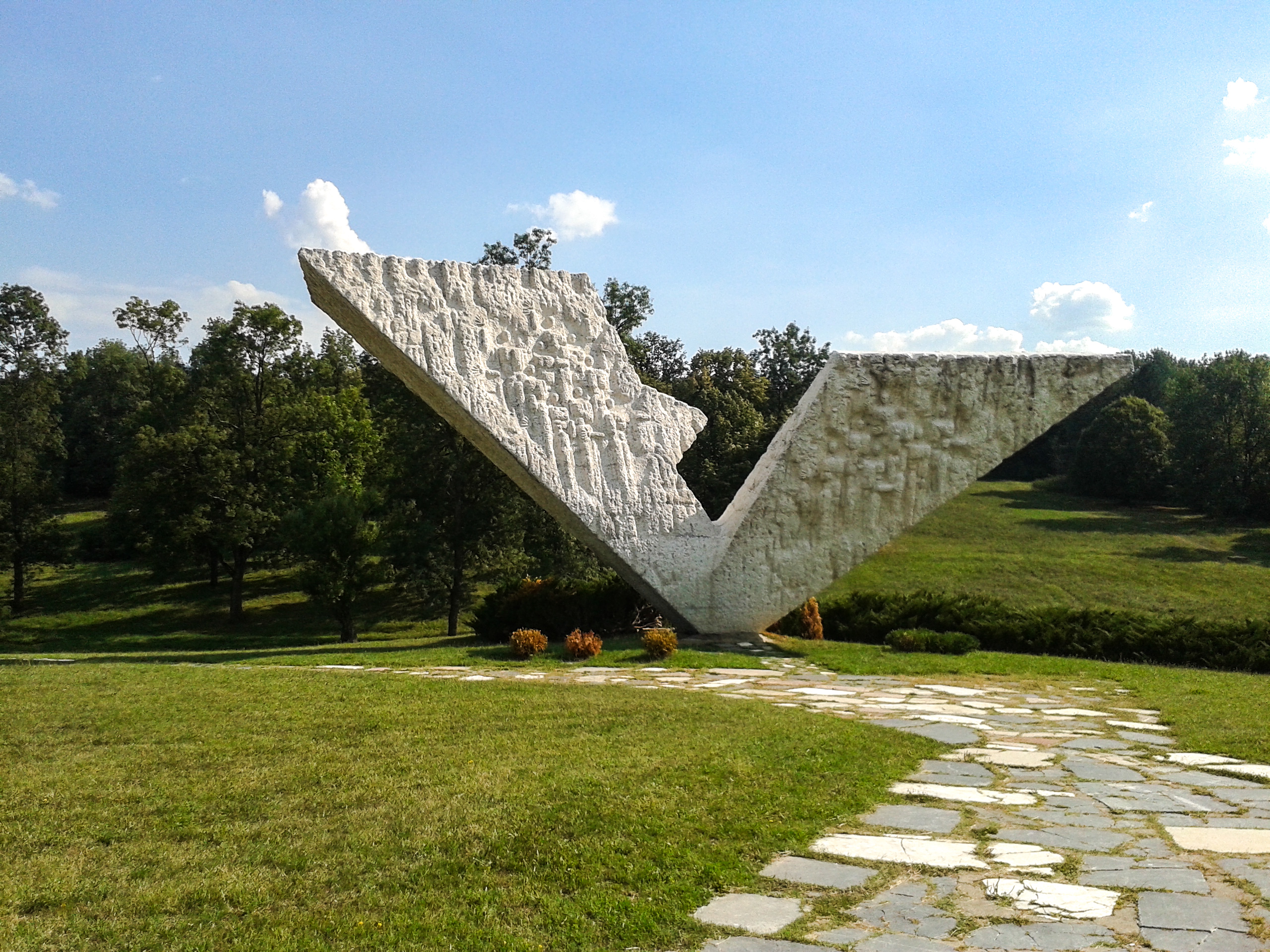
Šumarice Memorial Park by Miodrag Živković in Kragujevac, 1953

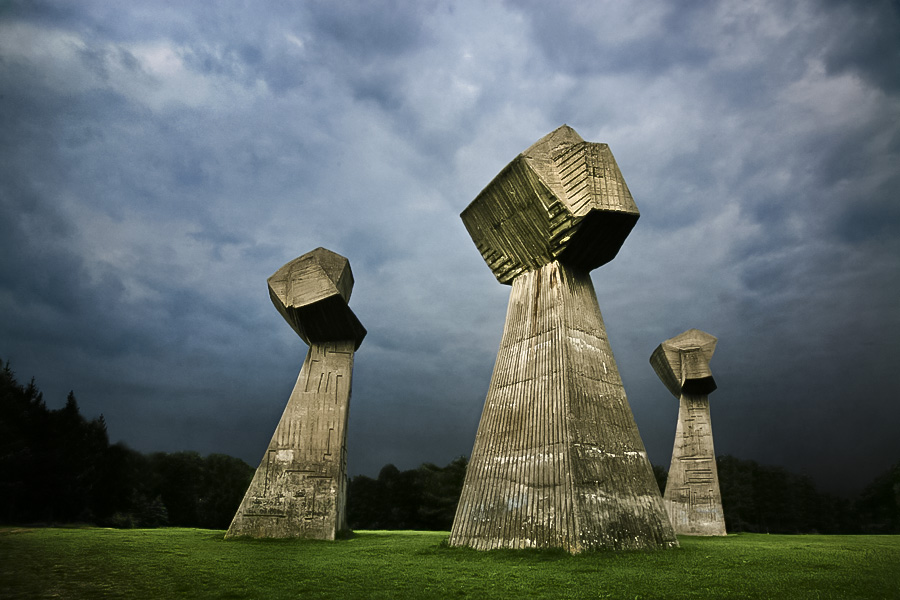
"Three fists" Monument by Ivan Sabolić in Niš, 1963

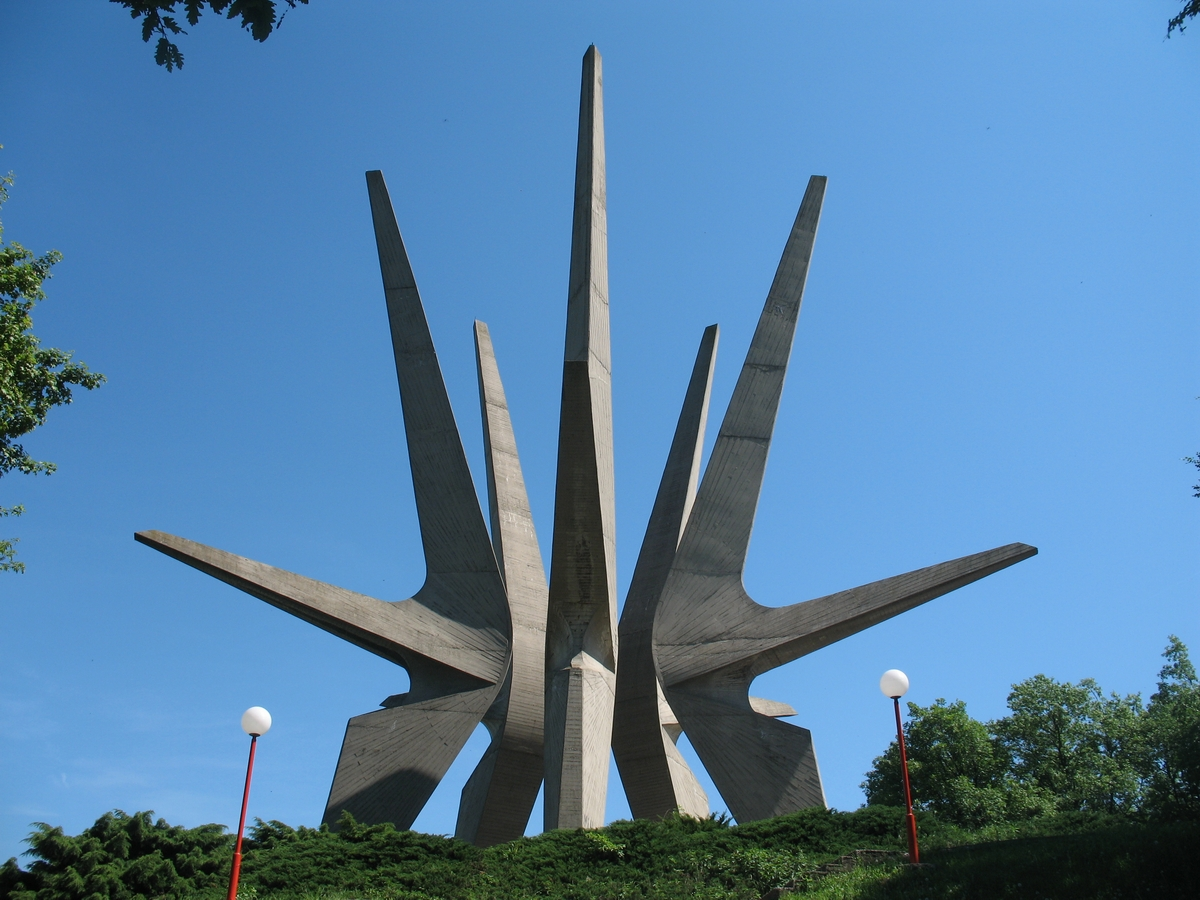
Monument to Kosmaj Partisan Detachment by Vojin Stojić and Gradimir Stojaković in Belgrade, 1971

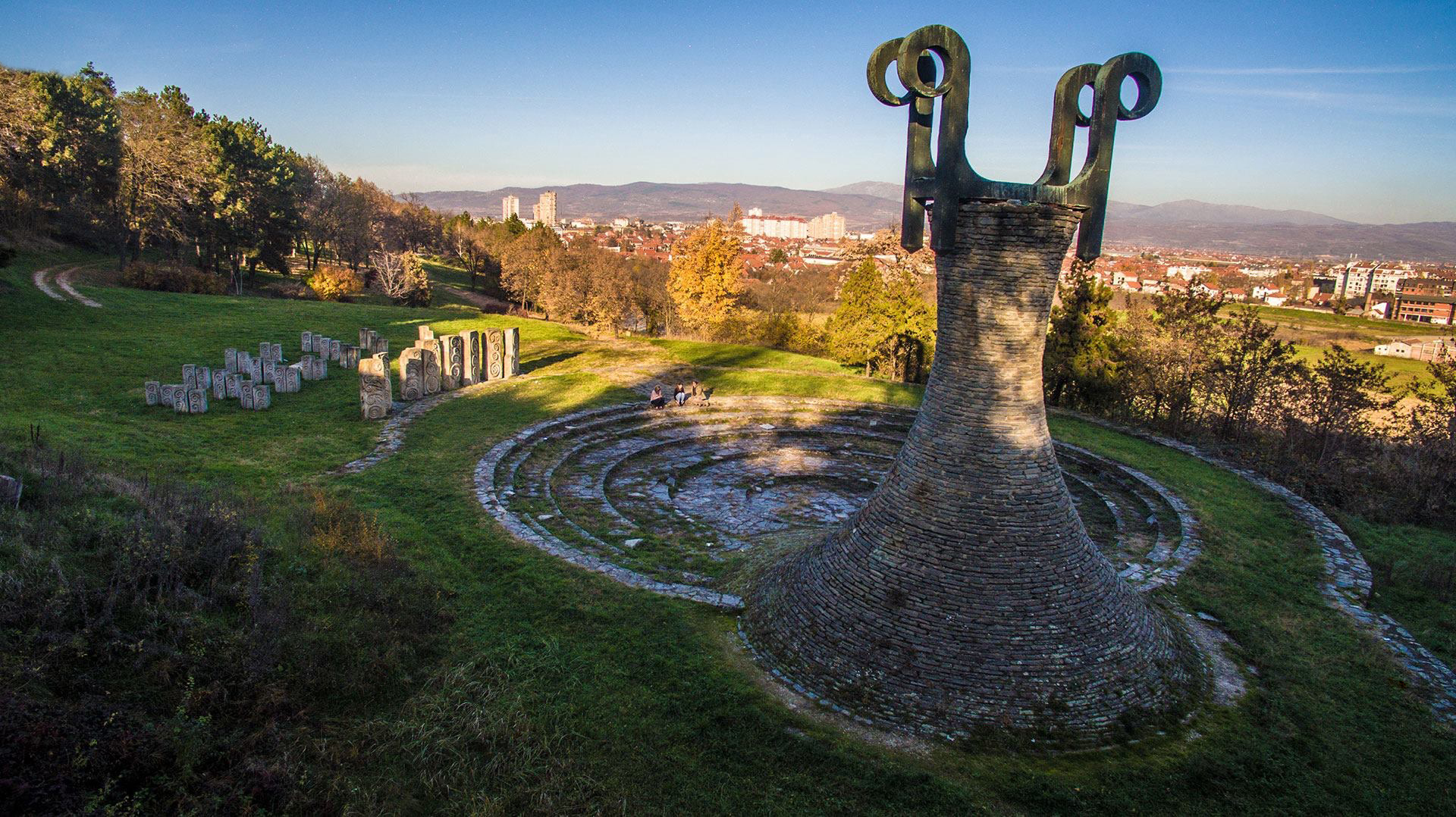
Leskovac Memorial Park by Bogdan Bogdanović, 1971

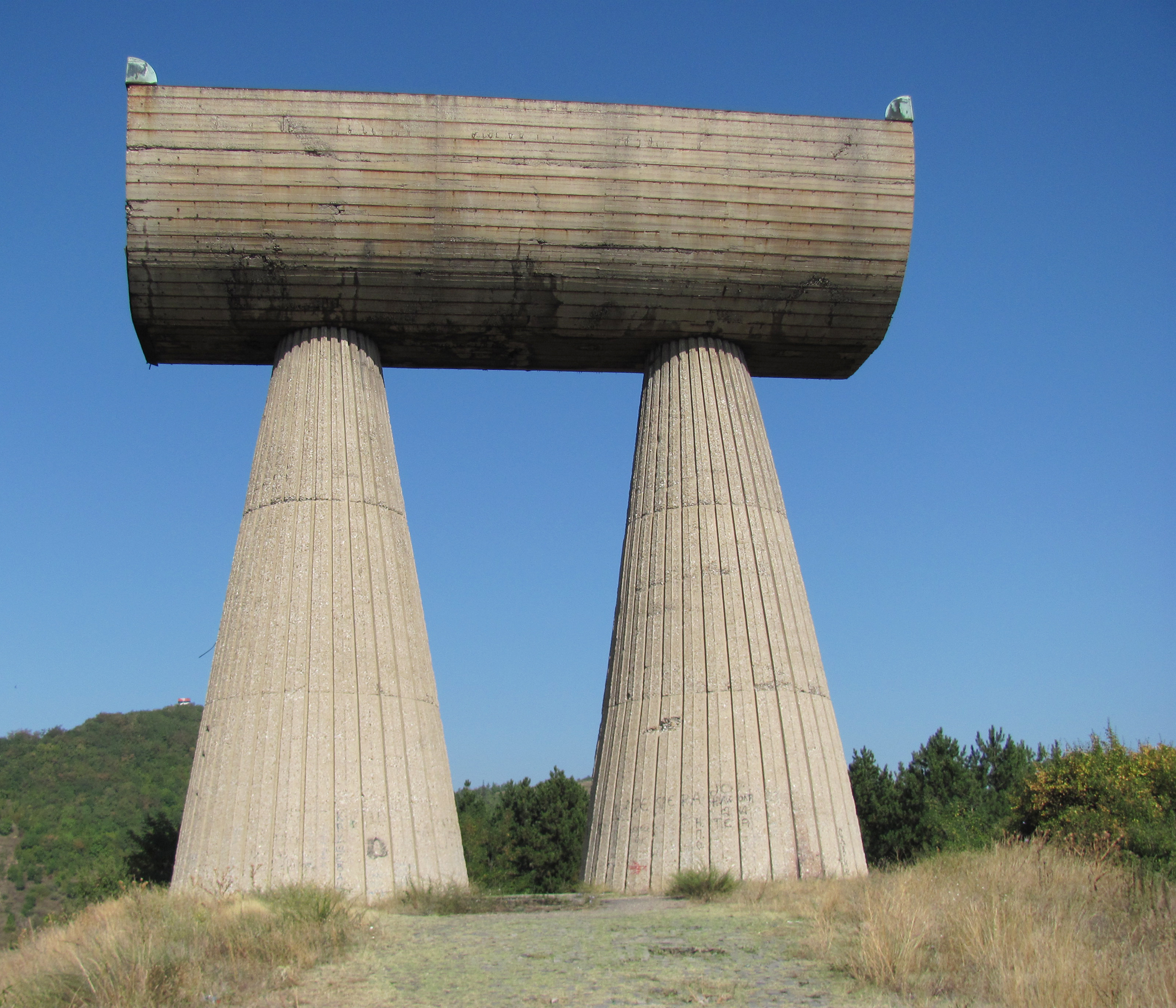
Miners' monument by Bogdan Bogdanović in Kosovska Mitrovica, 1973

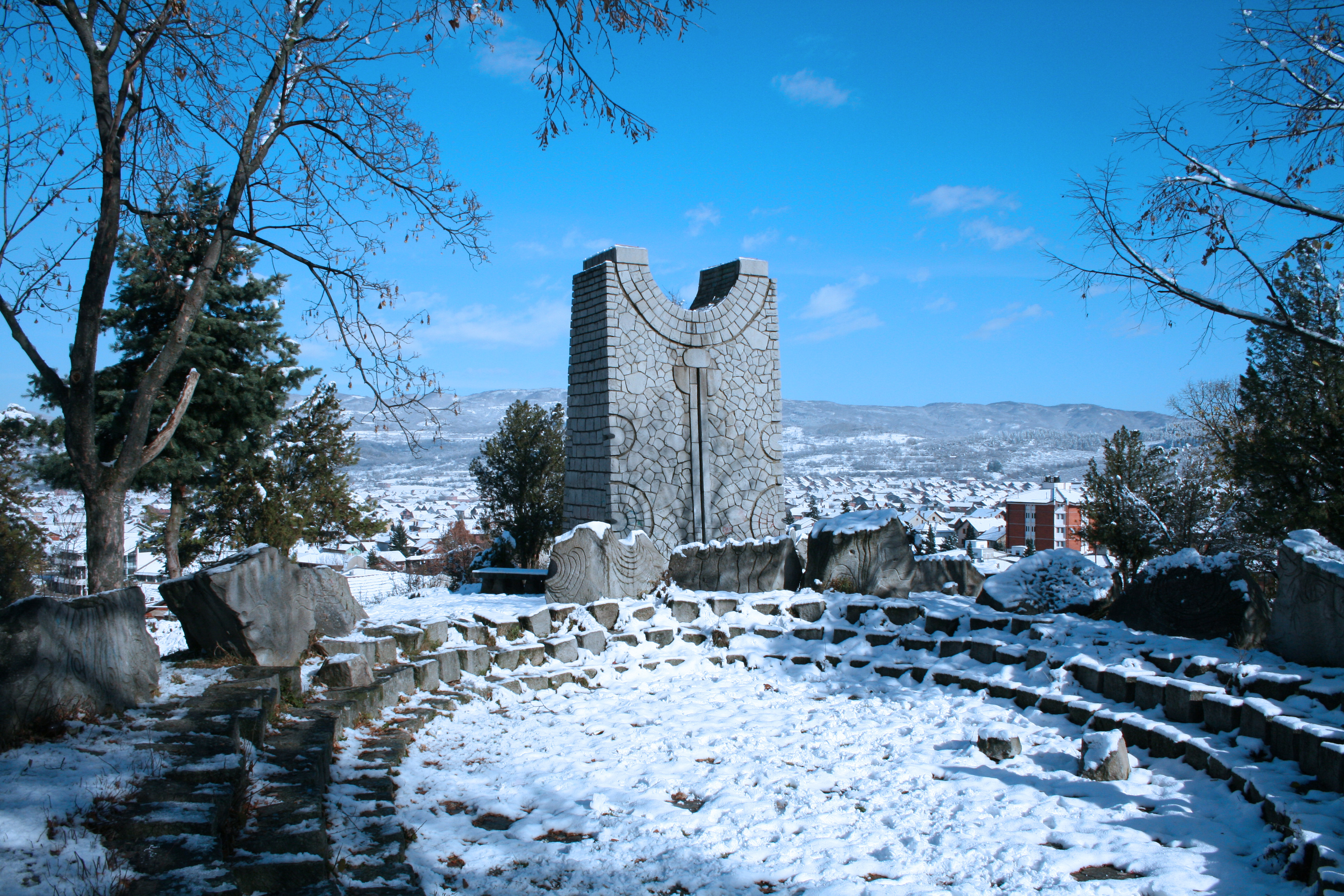
Shrine to the fallen freedom fighters by Bogdan Bogdanović in Vlasotince, 1975

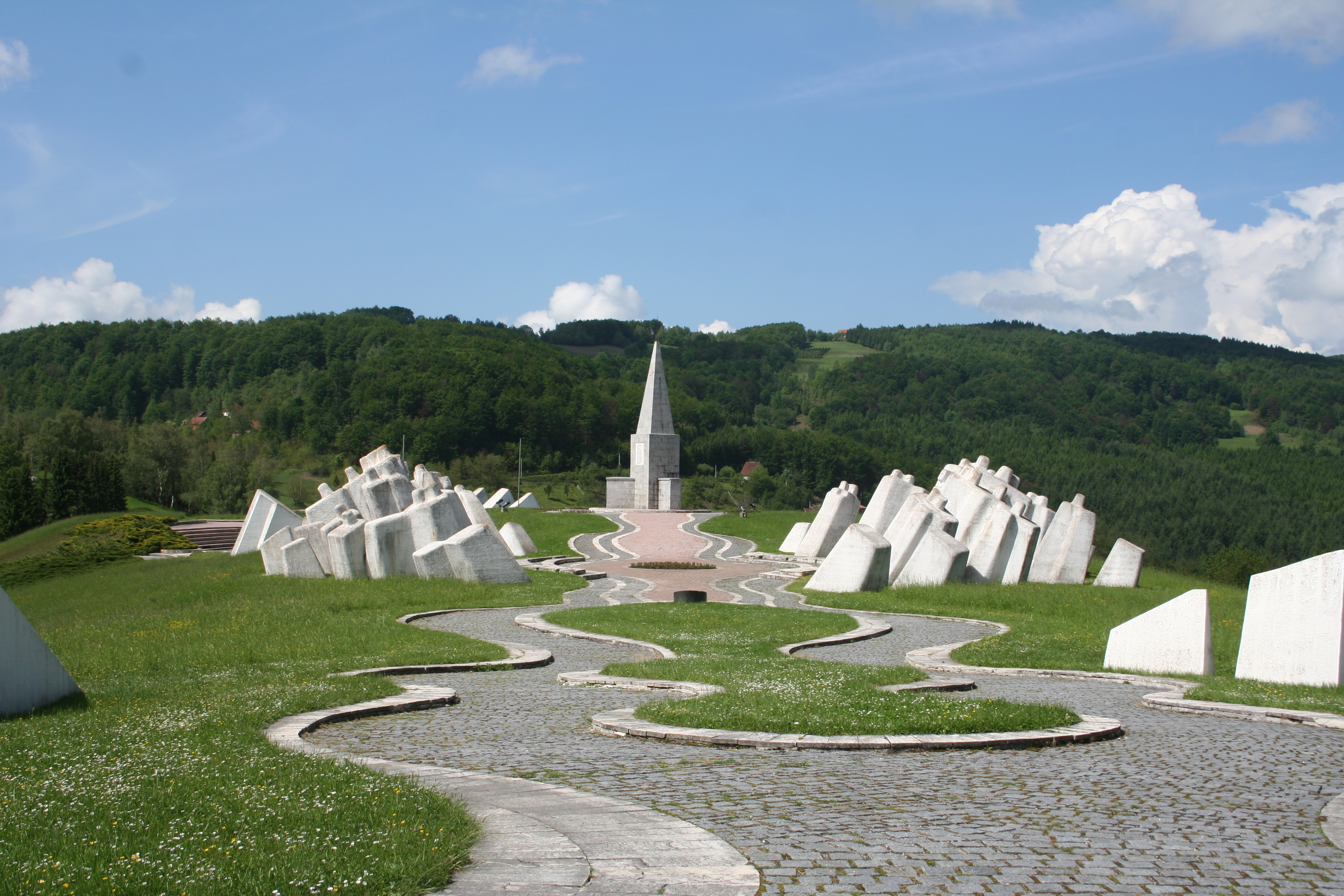
Kadinjača Memorial by Miodrag Živković and Aleksandar Đokić, 1979

=== Brutalism ===
In the late 1950s and early 1960s Brutalism began to garner a following within Yugoslavia, particularly among younger architects, a trend possibly influenced by the 1959 disbandment of the Congrès Internationaux d'Architecture Moderne. Besides numerous brutalist buildings in the capital, other notable examples can be found in Novi Sad, Priština, Požarevac, Arilje, Užice, Sremska Mitrovica and other parts of the country. Brutalism would be a prevalent architectural style in Serbia, changing the design, scale and use of concrete elements in building construction, up until the end of the 20th century with the breakup of Socialist Yugoslavia. Yugoslav Brutalism in Serbia incorporates elements of modernism, structuralism, metabolism, and constructivism, with later prefabricated buildings moving away from pure exposed concrete brutalist designs.

- Belgrade's Museum of Yugoslavia (1962) by Mihajlo Janković
- New Belgrade's town hall (1967) by Stojan Maksimovic and Branislav Jovin
- Belgrade's Toblerone Tower (1963) by Rista Šekerinski
- Kruševac's Hotel Rubin (1974)
- Belgrade's 25 May Sportcenter (1975) by Ivan Antić
- Belgrade's Eastern City Gate (1976) by Vera Ćirković
- Belgrade's Western City Gate (1977) by Mihajlo Mitrović
- Novi Sad's Elektrovojvodina (1977/78) by Milan Matović
- New Belgrade's Blocks 22, 23, 28, 30, 61, 62, 63
- Užice's Hotel Zlatibor (1981) by Svetlana Kana Radević
- Paraćin's Hotel Petrus (1981) by Mališa Milenković
- Novi Sad's Liman 1, 2, 3, 4 (1960–1990)
  - Novi Sad's University campus (1960–1990)
- Novi Sad's Bistrica and Satelit by Natalija Nataša Reba and Blagoje Reba (1950–1990)
- Novi Sad's New Detelinara (1980–1989)
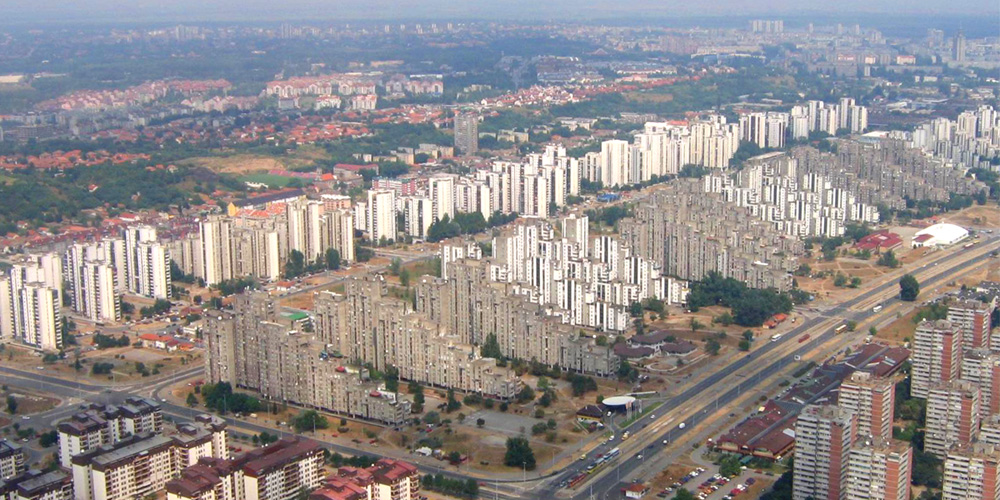
Bežanijski Blokovi in New Belgrade, Belgrade, 1948/90

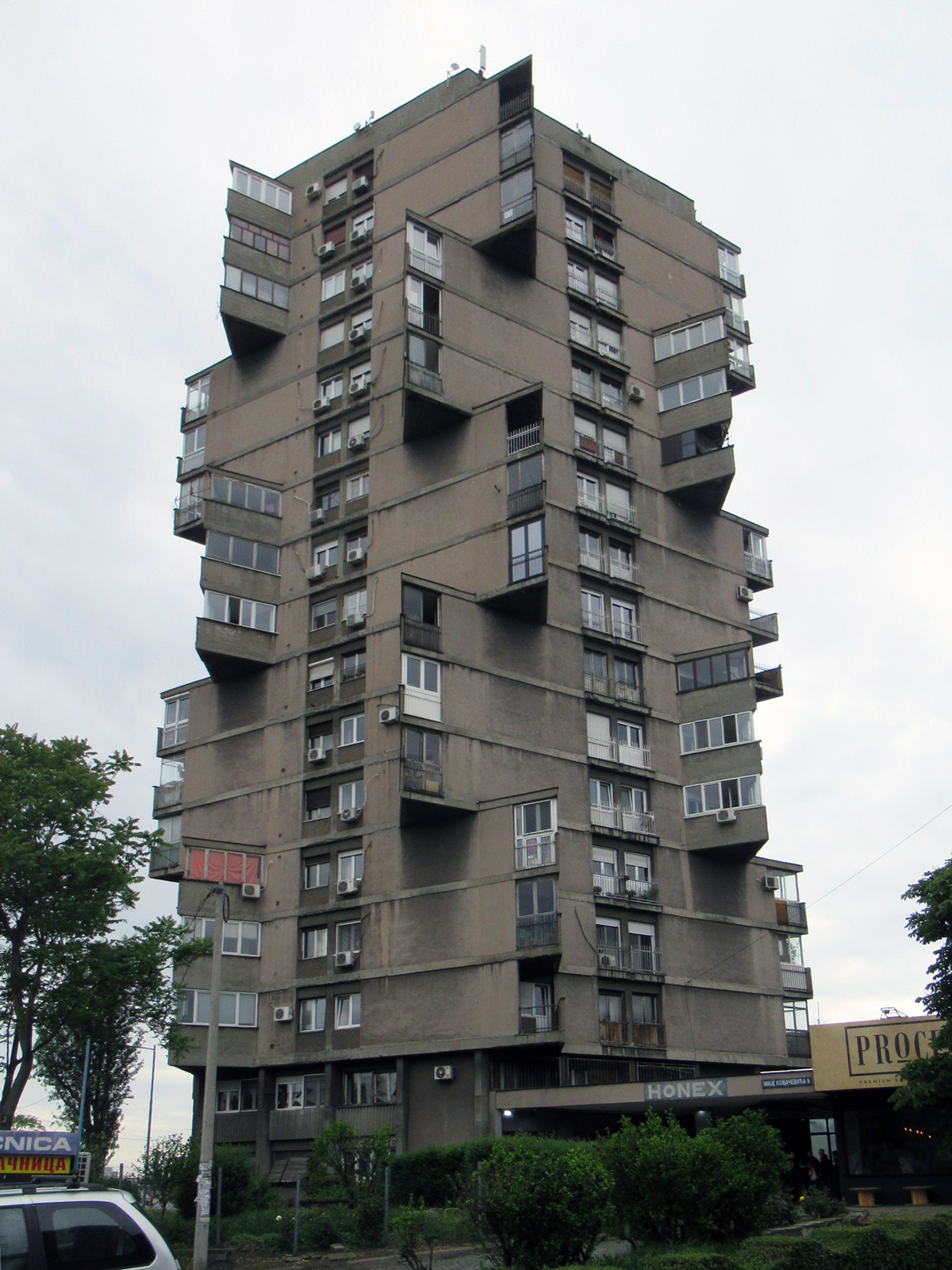
Toblerone Tower by Rista Šekerinski in Belgrade, 1963

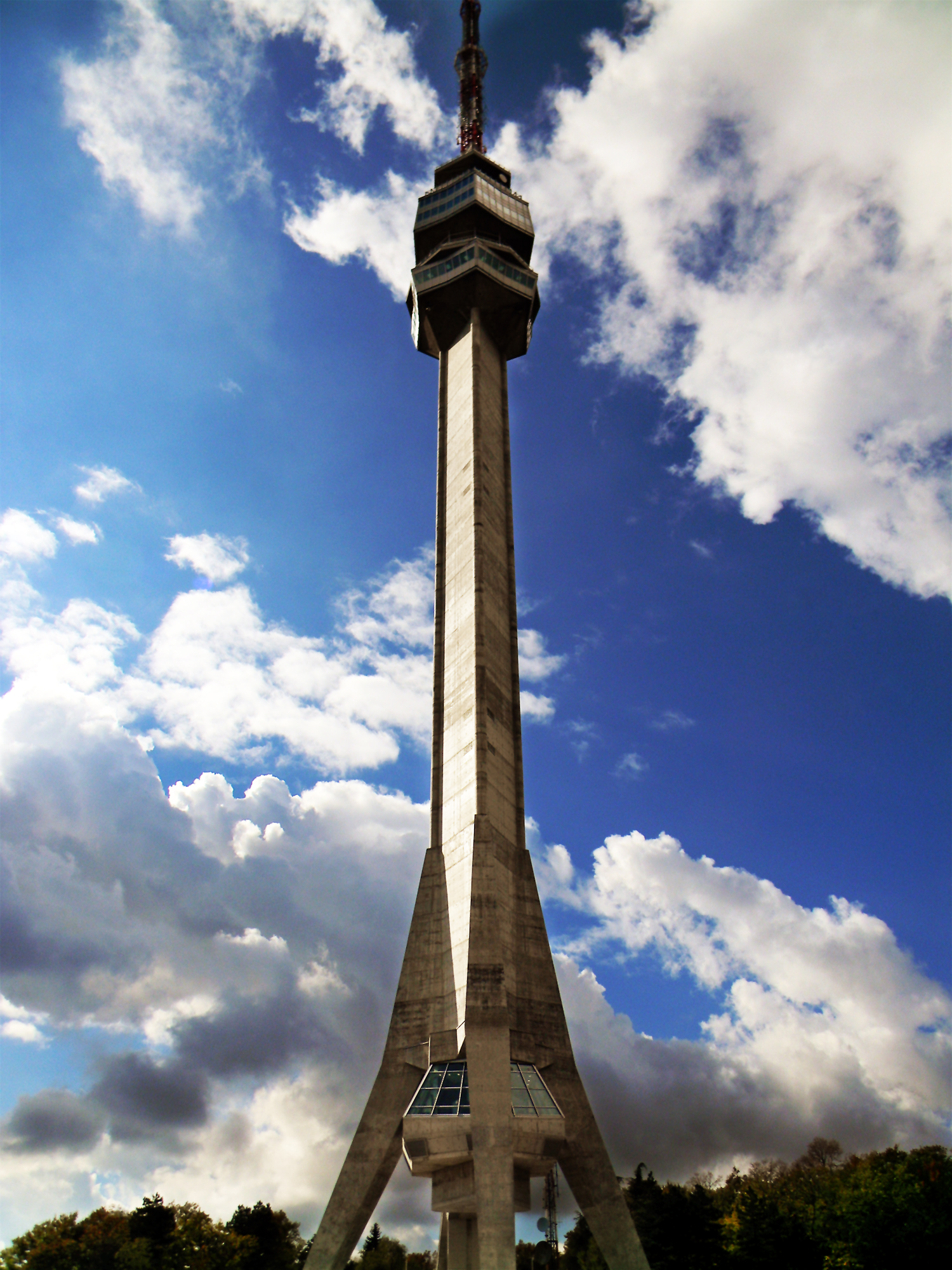
Avala Tower by Uglješa Bogunović and Slobodan Janjić, 1965

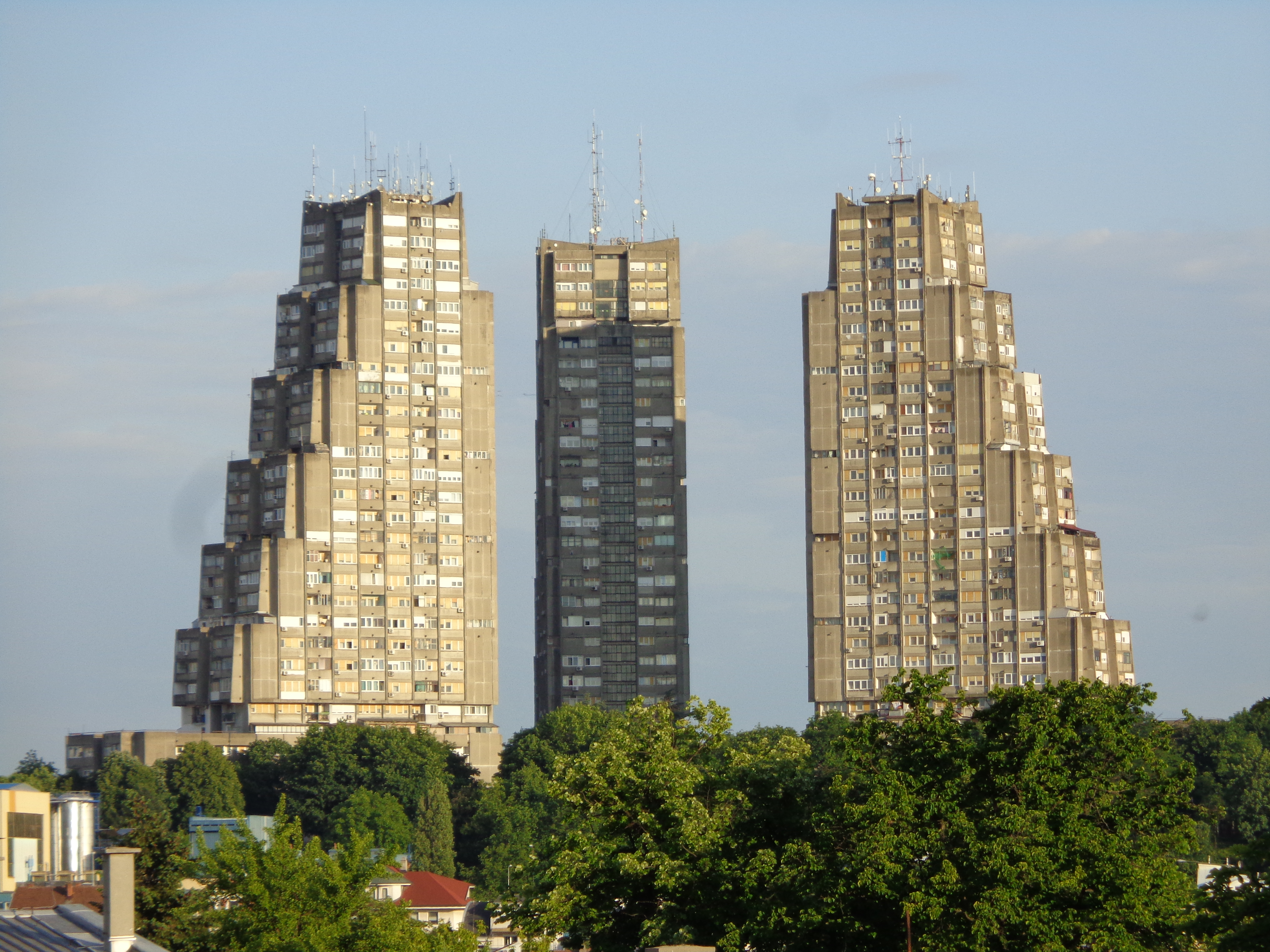
Eastern City Gate by Vera Ćirković in Belgrade, 1976

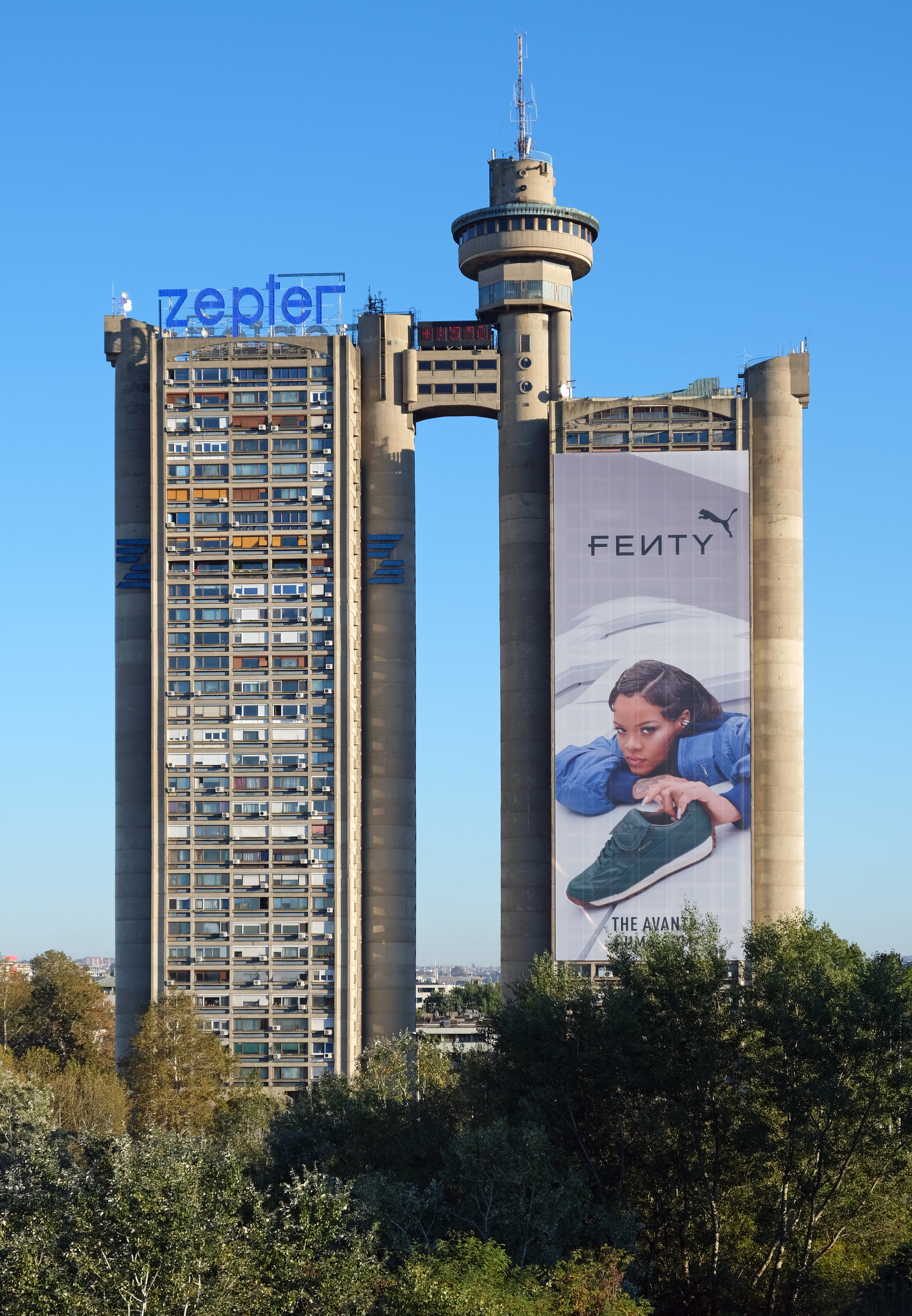
Western City Gate by Mihajlo Mitrović in Belgrade, 1977

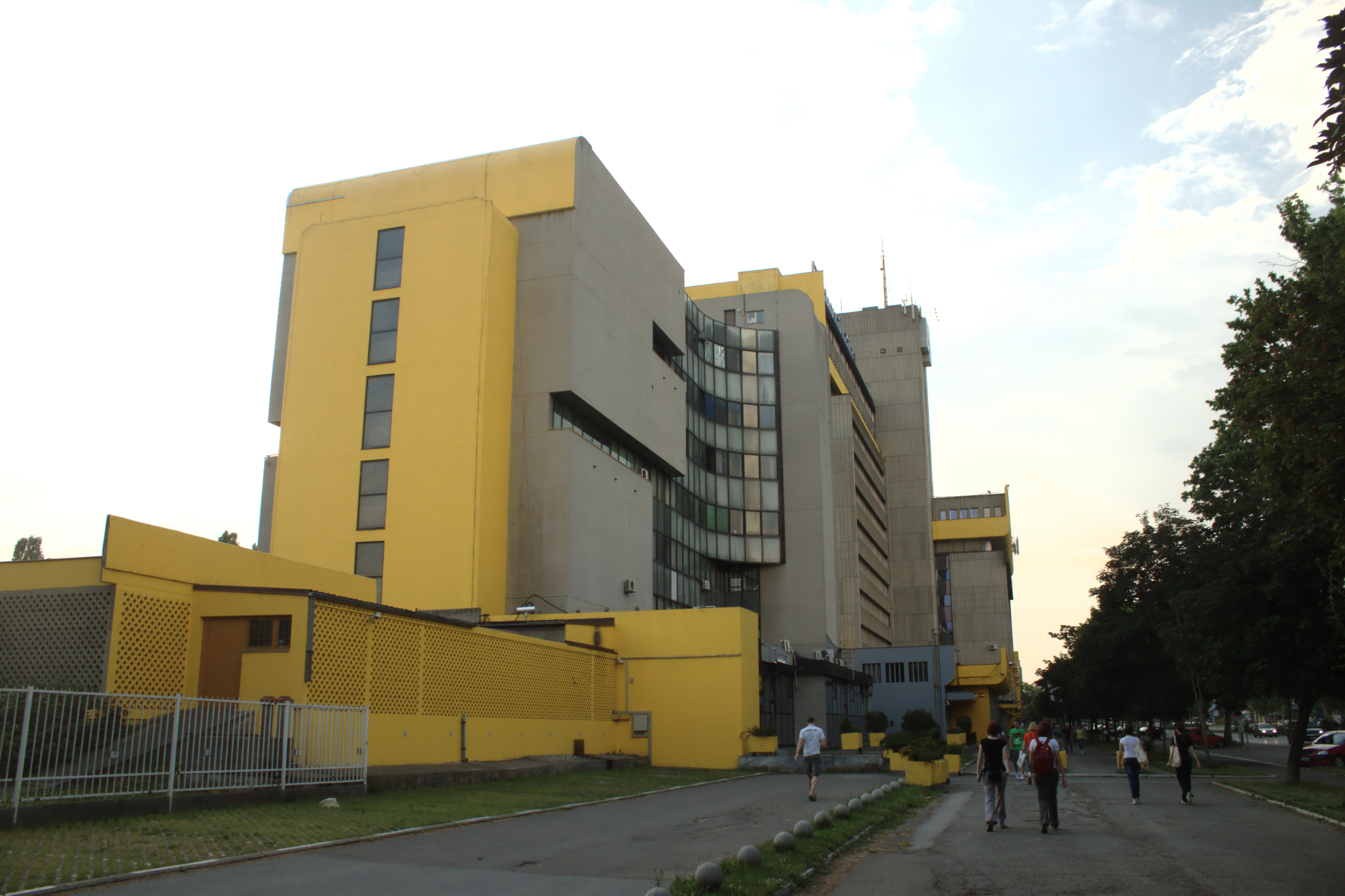
Elektrovojvodina Building by Milan Matović in Novi Sad, 1977/78

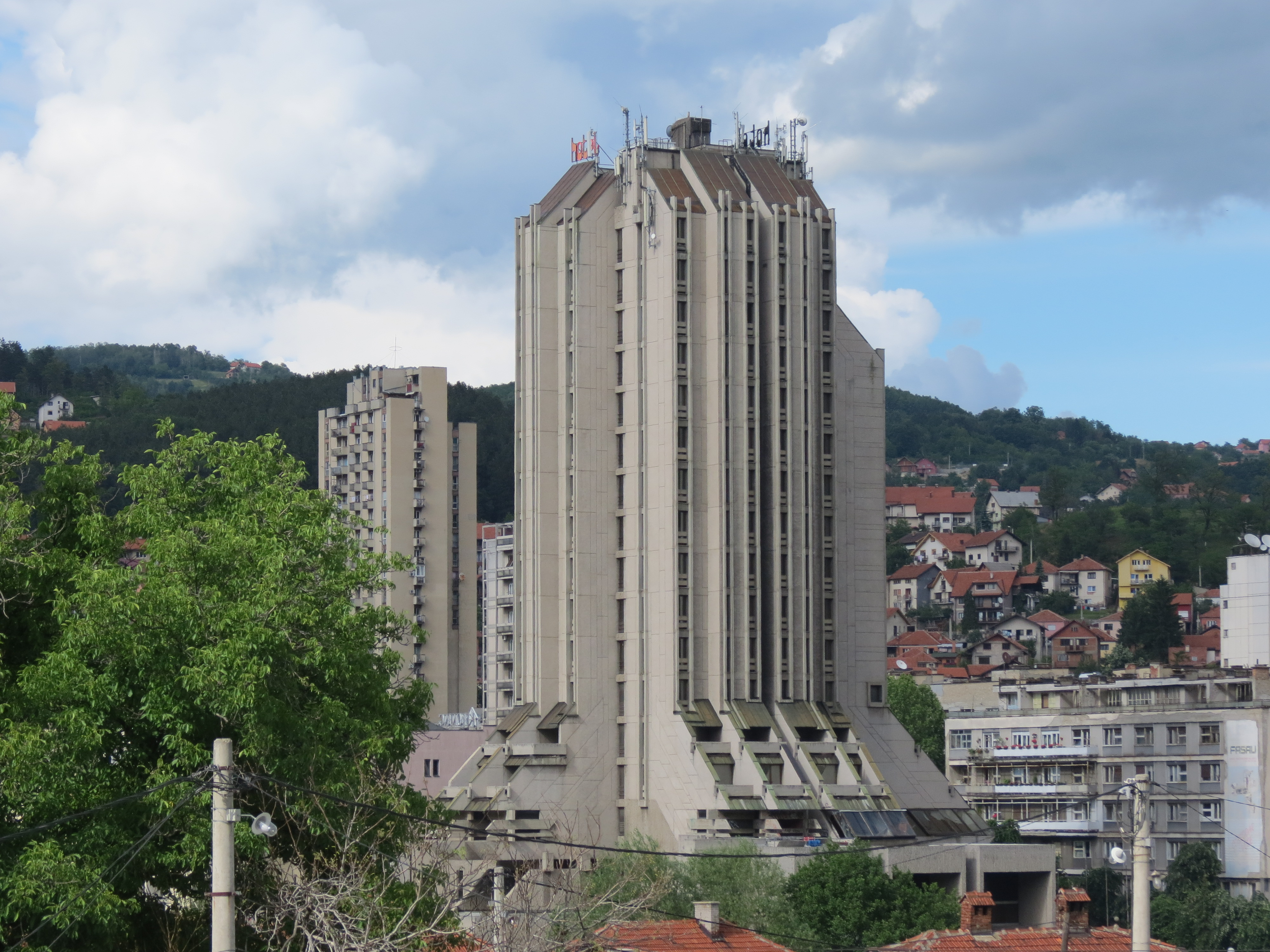
Hotel Zlatibor by Svetlana Kana Radević in Užice, 1981

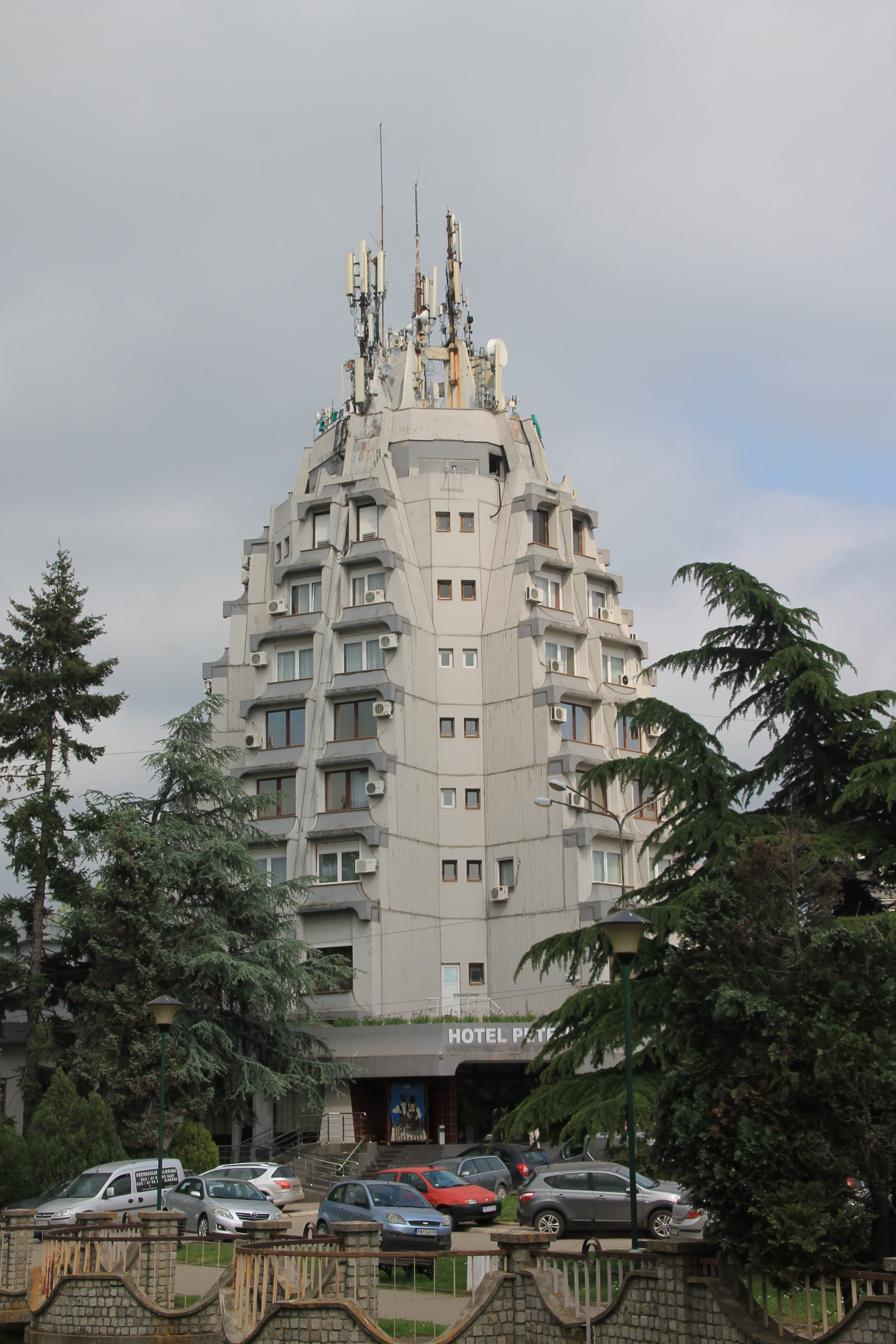
Hotel Petrus by Mališa Milenković in Paraćin, 1981

=== Decentralization ===
With 1950s decentralization and liberalization policies in SFR Yugoslavia, architecture became increasingly fractured along ethnic lines. Architects increasingly focused on building with reference to the architectural heritage of their individual socialist republics in the form of critical regionalism. Growing distinction of individual ethnic architectural identities within Yugoslavia was exacerbated with the 1972 decentralization of the formerly centralized historical preservation authority, providing individual regions further opportunity to critically analyze their own cultural narratives.

==== International Style ====
International Style in Serbia in the later half of the 20th century mostly consists of buildings stripped from most decorative elements, having an emphasis on glass skyscraper styled designs, with earlier designs incorporating elements of brutalism. This trend would continue in the early decades of the 21st century, with some design variations starting to appear in the early 2010s.

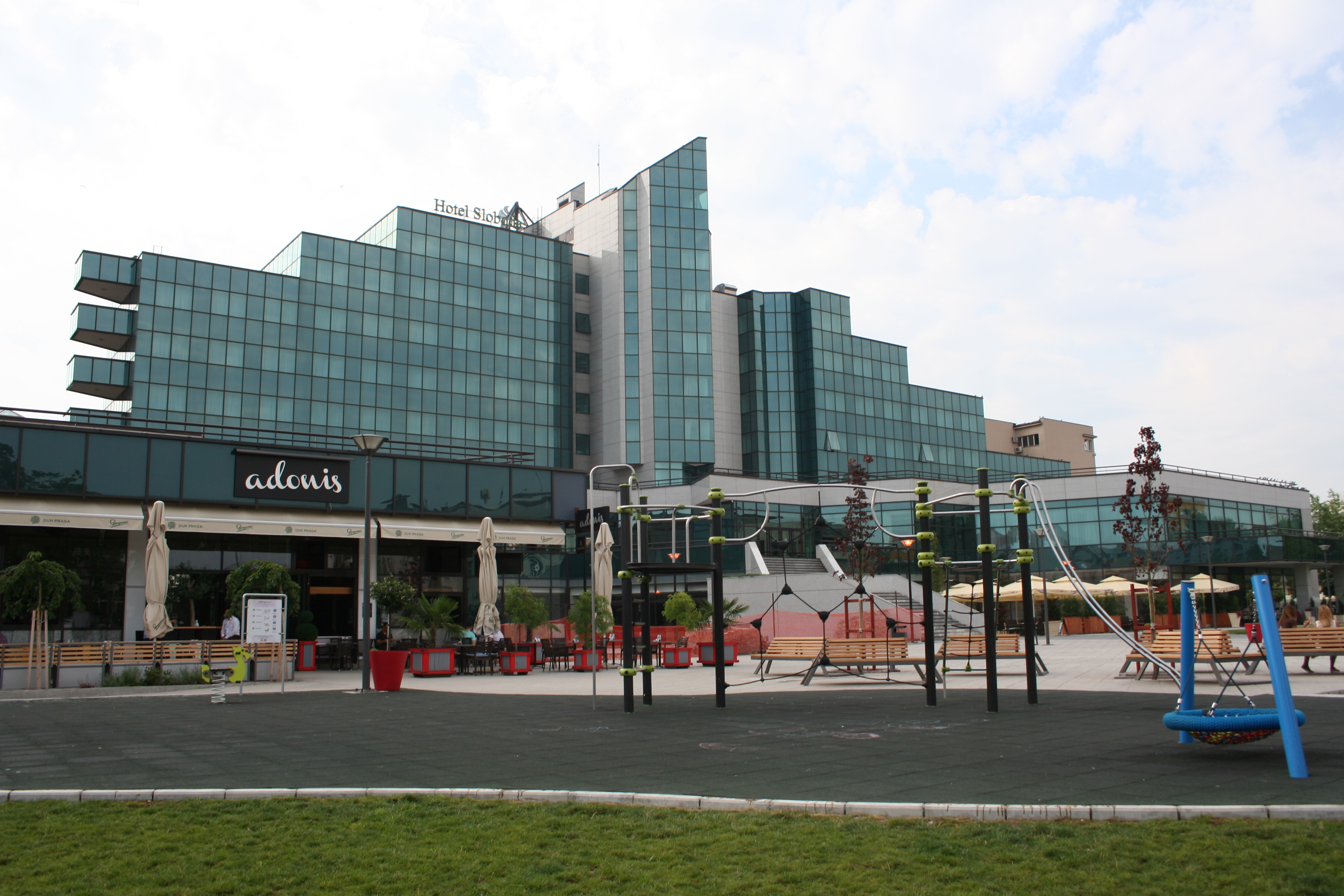
Hotel Sloboda by Slobodan Janjić in Šabac, 1977

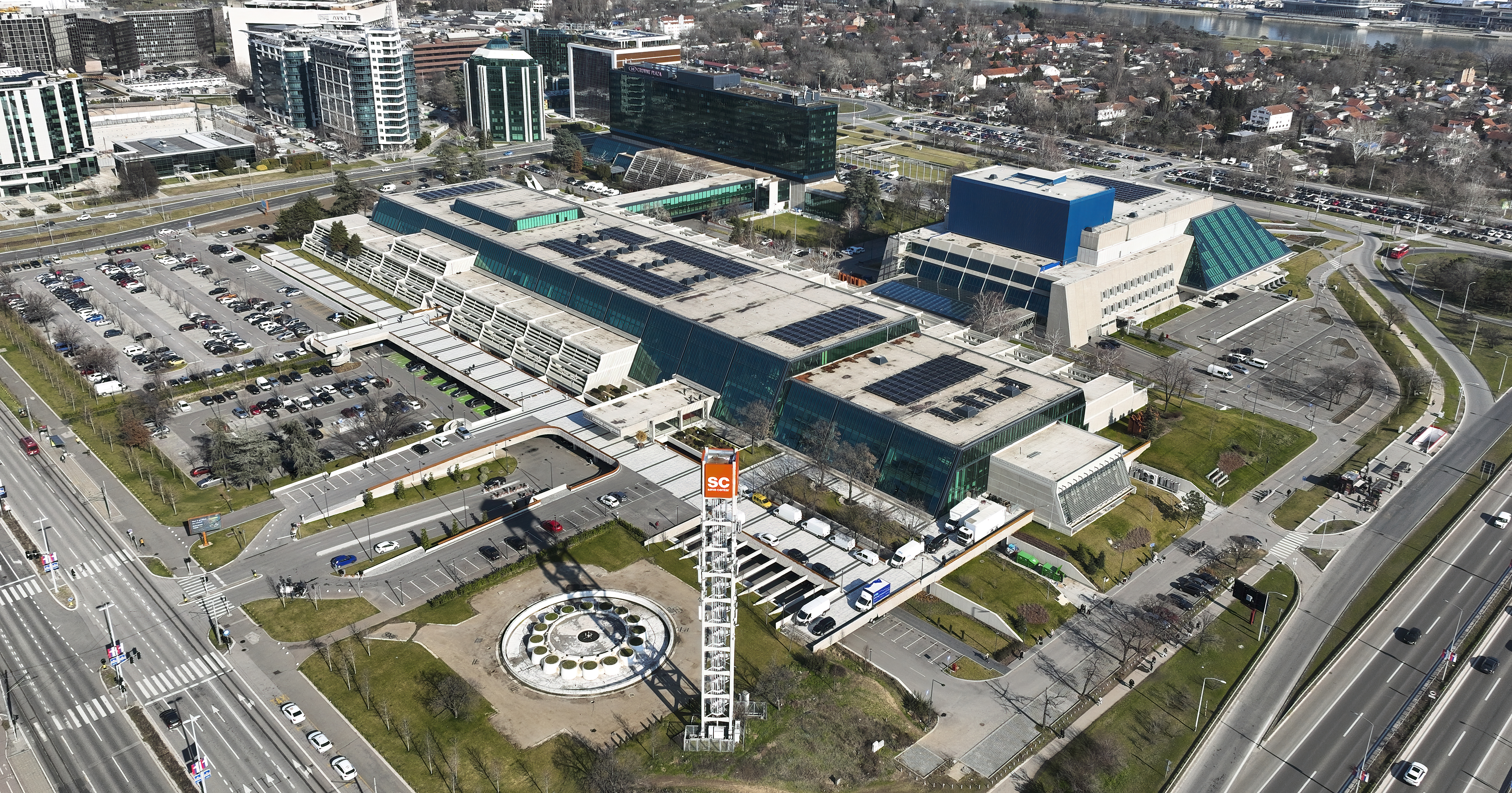
Sava Centar Stojan Maksimović in Belgrade, 1979

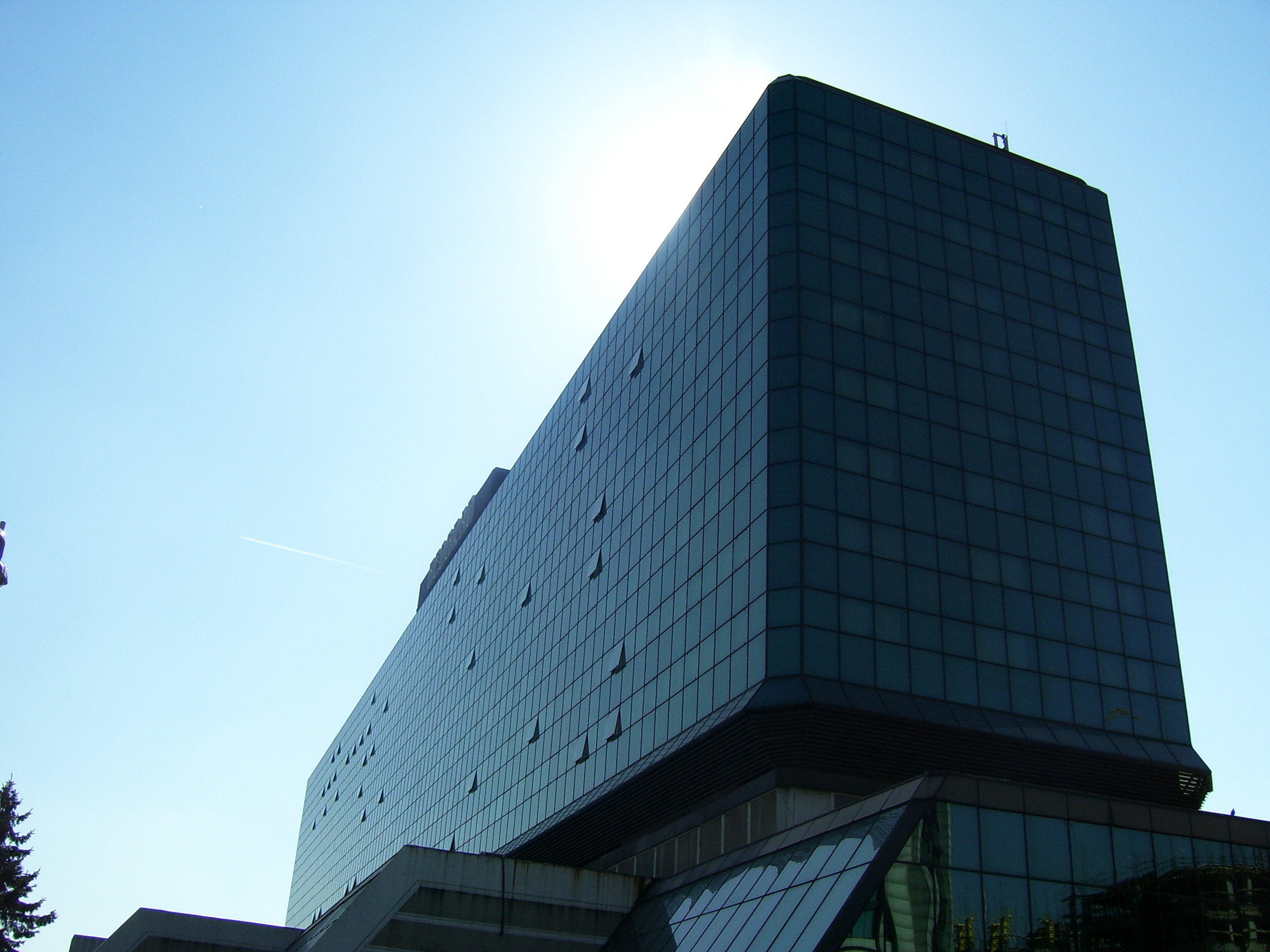
Crowne Plaza Belgrade by Stojan Maksimović, 1979

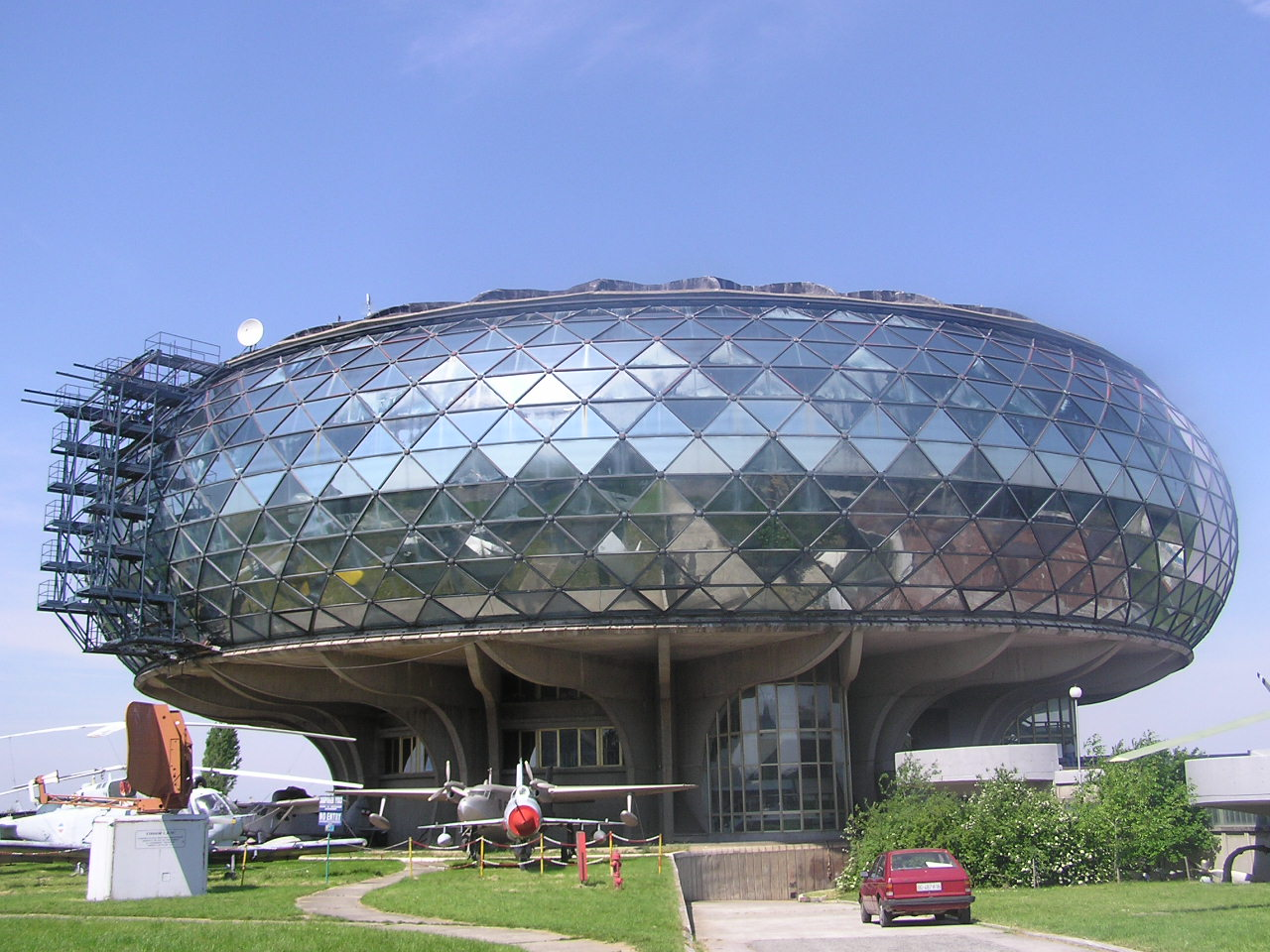
Aeronautical Museum Belgrade by Ivan Štraus, 1989

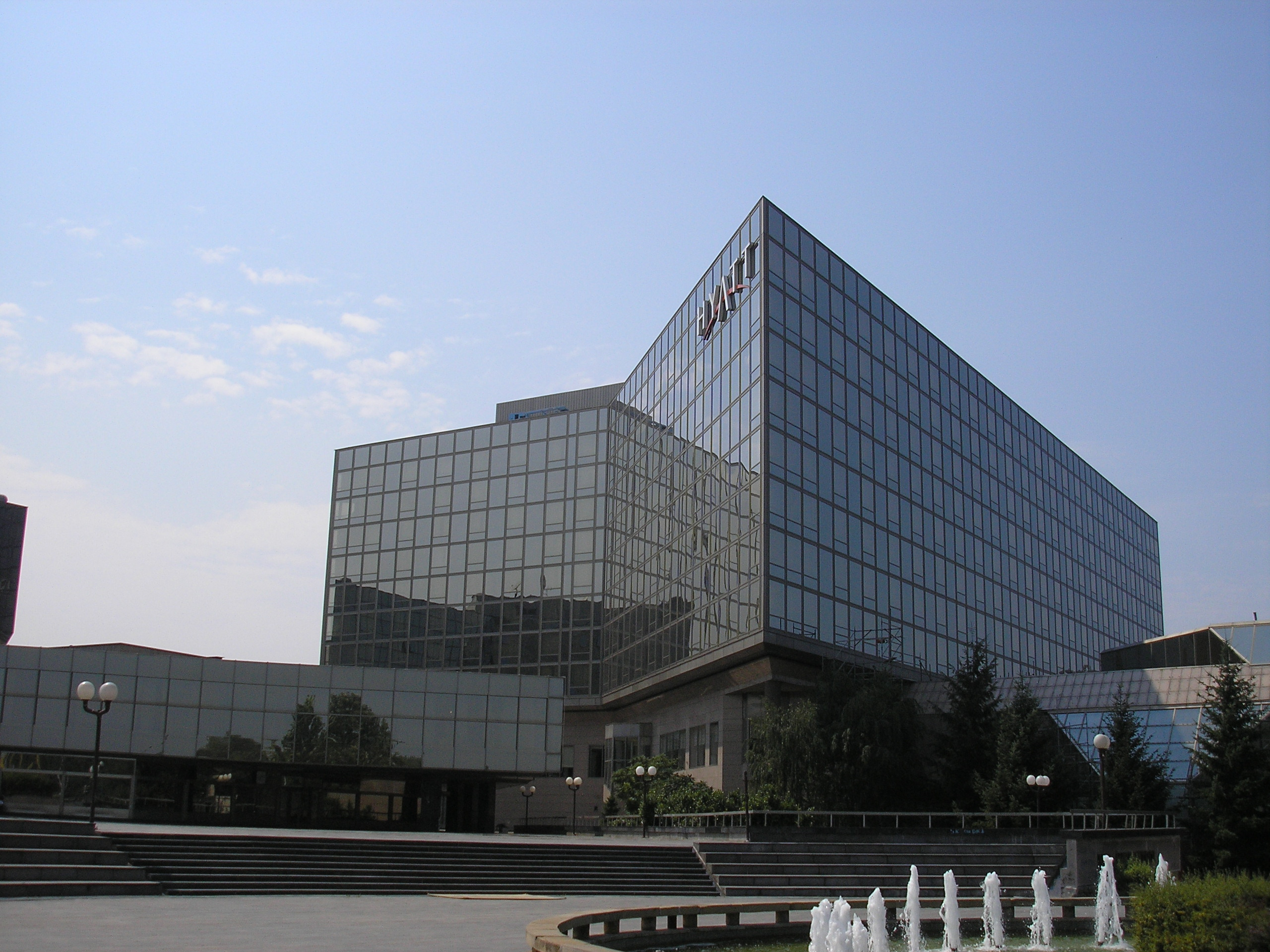
Hyatt Regency Belgrade, 1990

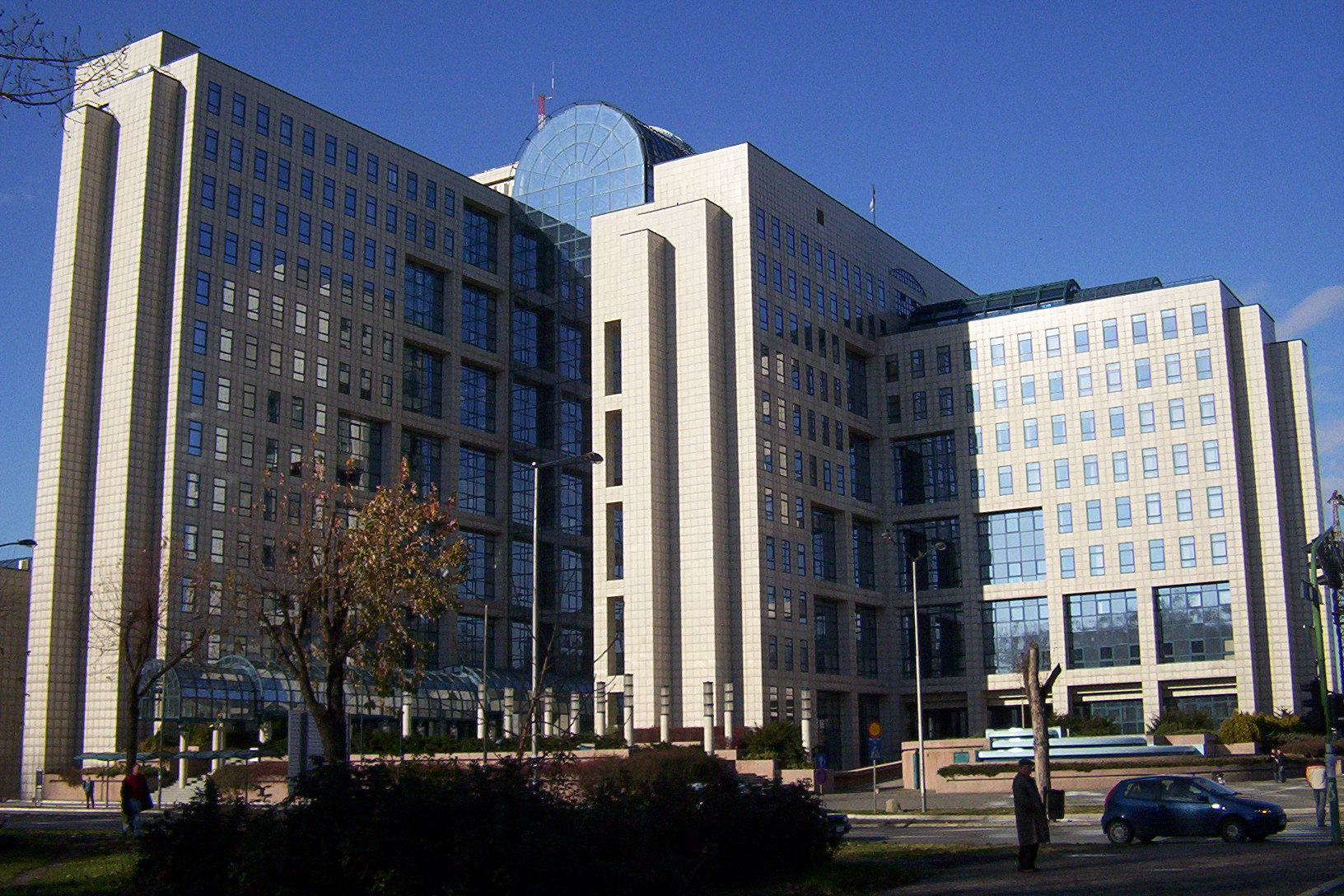
NIS building by Aleksandar Keković in Novi Sad, 1998

== Contemporary period ==
The international style, which had arrived in Yugoslavia already in the 1980s, took over the scene in Belgrade after the wars and isolation of the 1990s. Big real estate projects, including Sava City and the redevelopment of the Ušće Towers, led the ground, with little respect for the local architecturale heritage.

Before and also after the Yugoslav wars numerous architects left Serbia and continued their work in a number of European, American and African countries, creating several hundreds of building.

In 2015, an agreement was reached with Eagle Hills (a UAE company) on the Belgrade Waterfront (Beograd na vodi) deal, for the construction of a new part of the city on currently undeveloped wasteland by the riverside. This project, officially started in 2015 and is one of the largest urban development projects in Europe, will cost at least 3.5 billion euros.

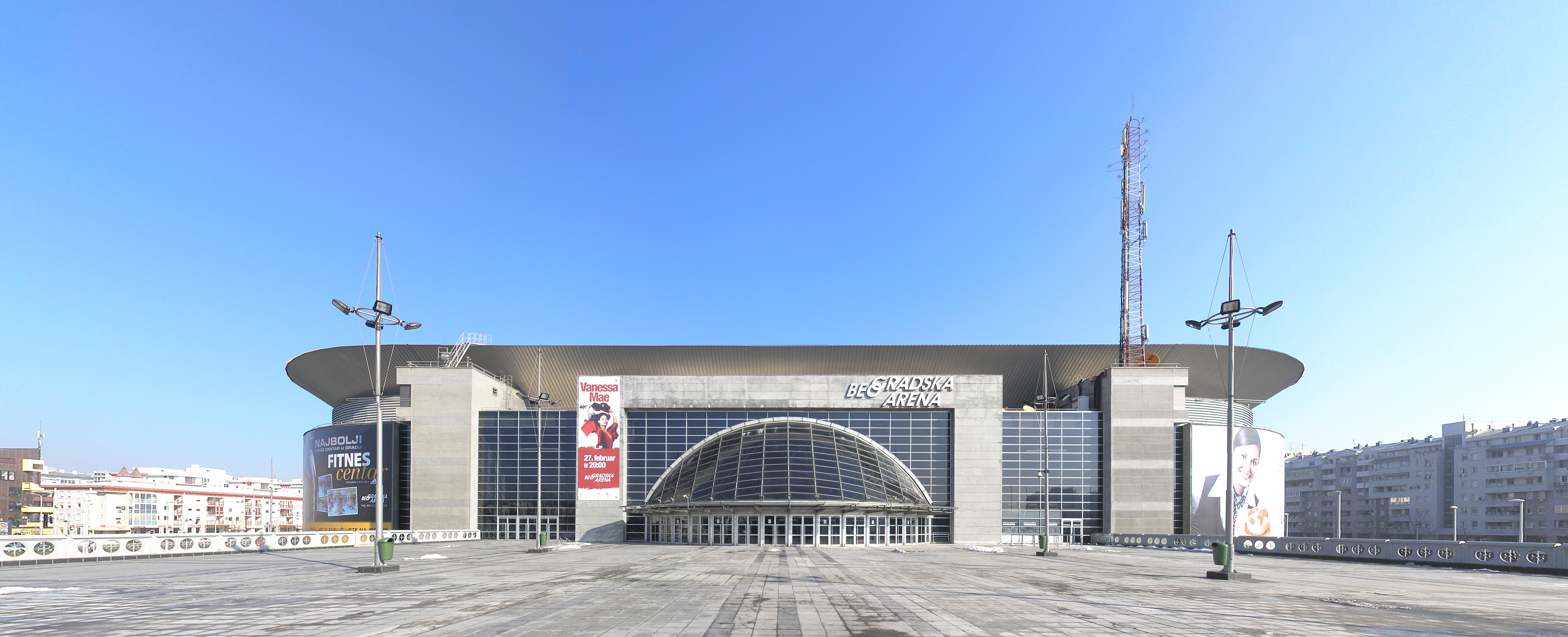
Belgrade Arena by Vlada Slavica in Belgrade, 2004

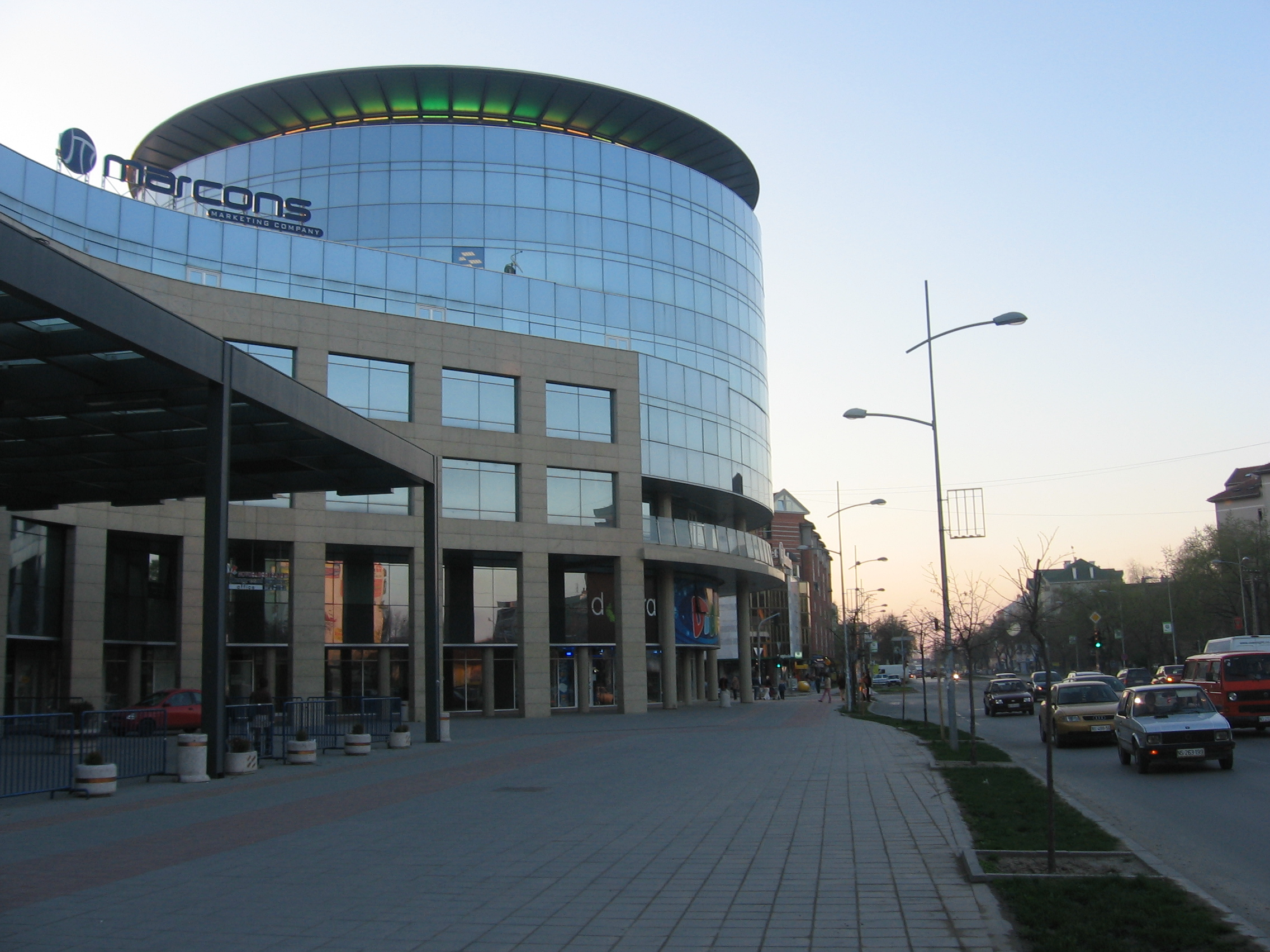
Novi Sad Fair Master Centar by Đorđe Grbić, 2007

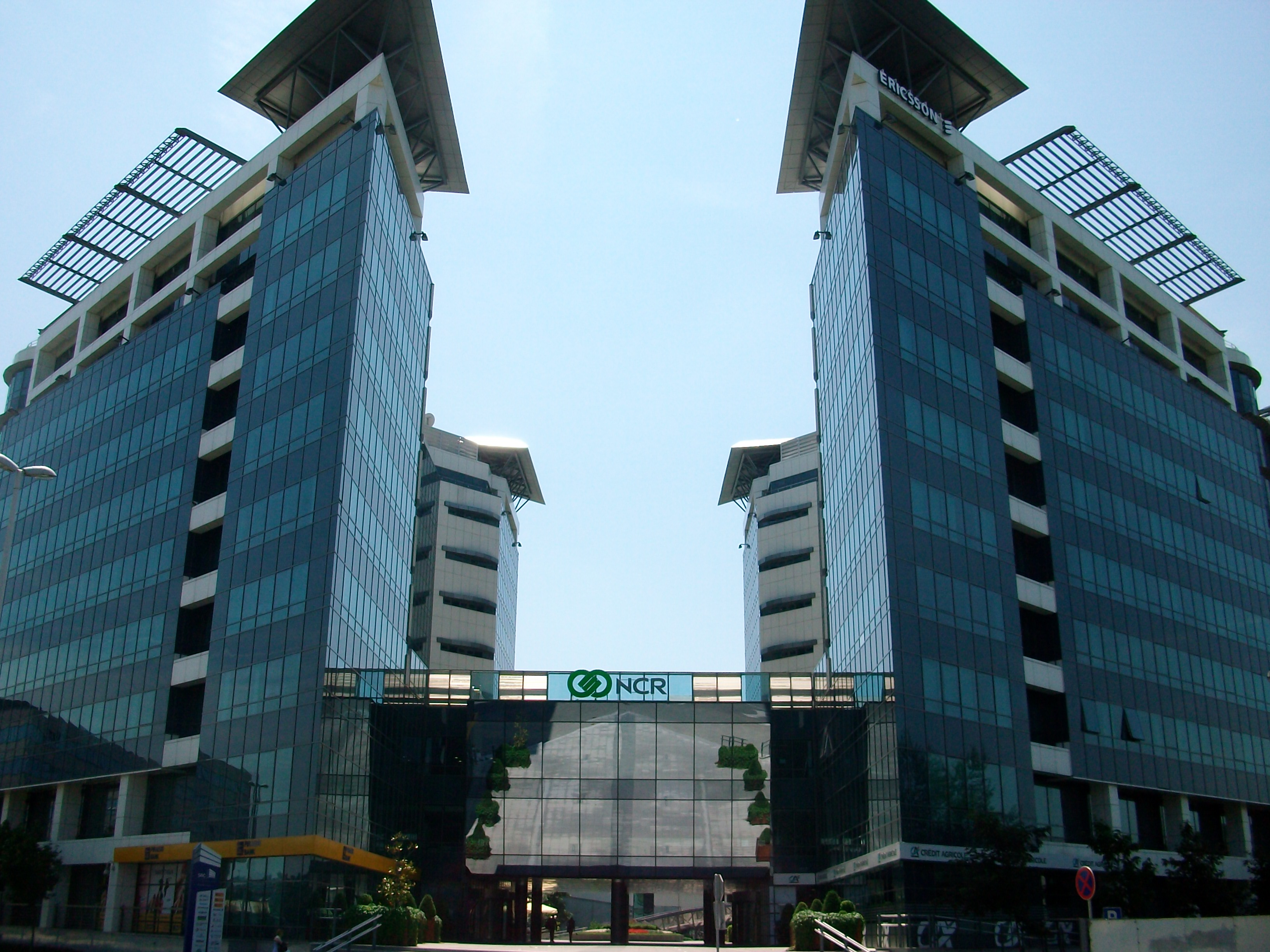
Sava City (Savograd) by Mario Jobst and Miodrag Trpković in Belgrade, 2010

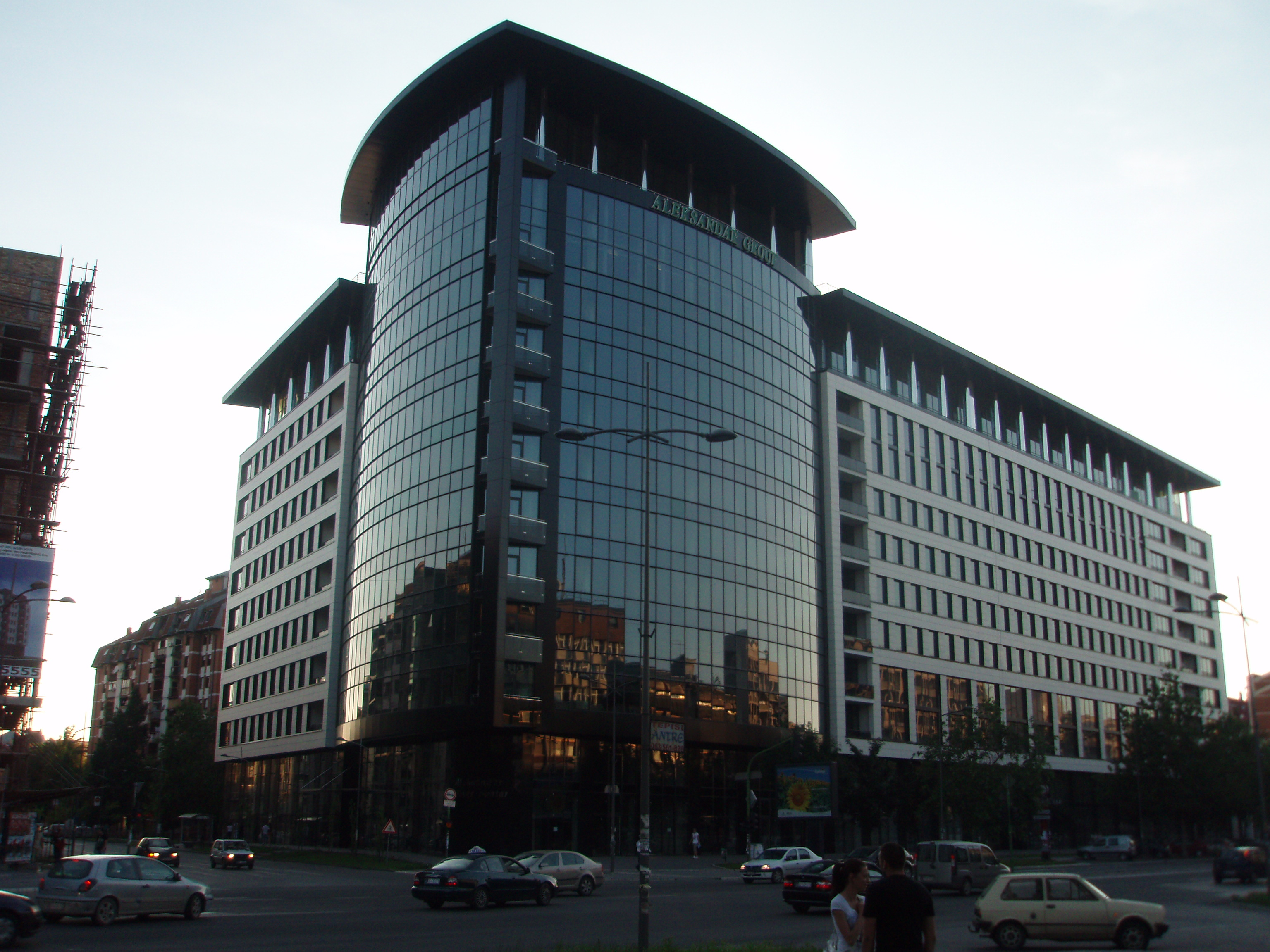
Aleksandar Bulevar Centar by Radonja Dabetić, Andraš Lukač and Milivoj Dajićin in Novi Sad, 2010

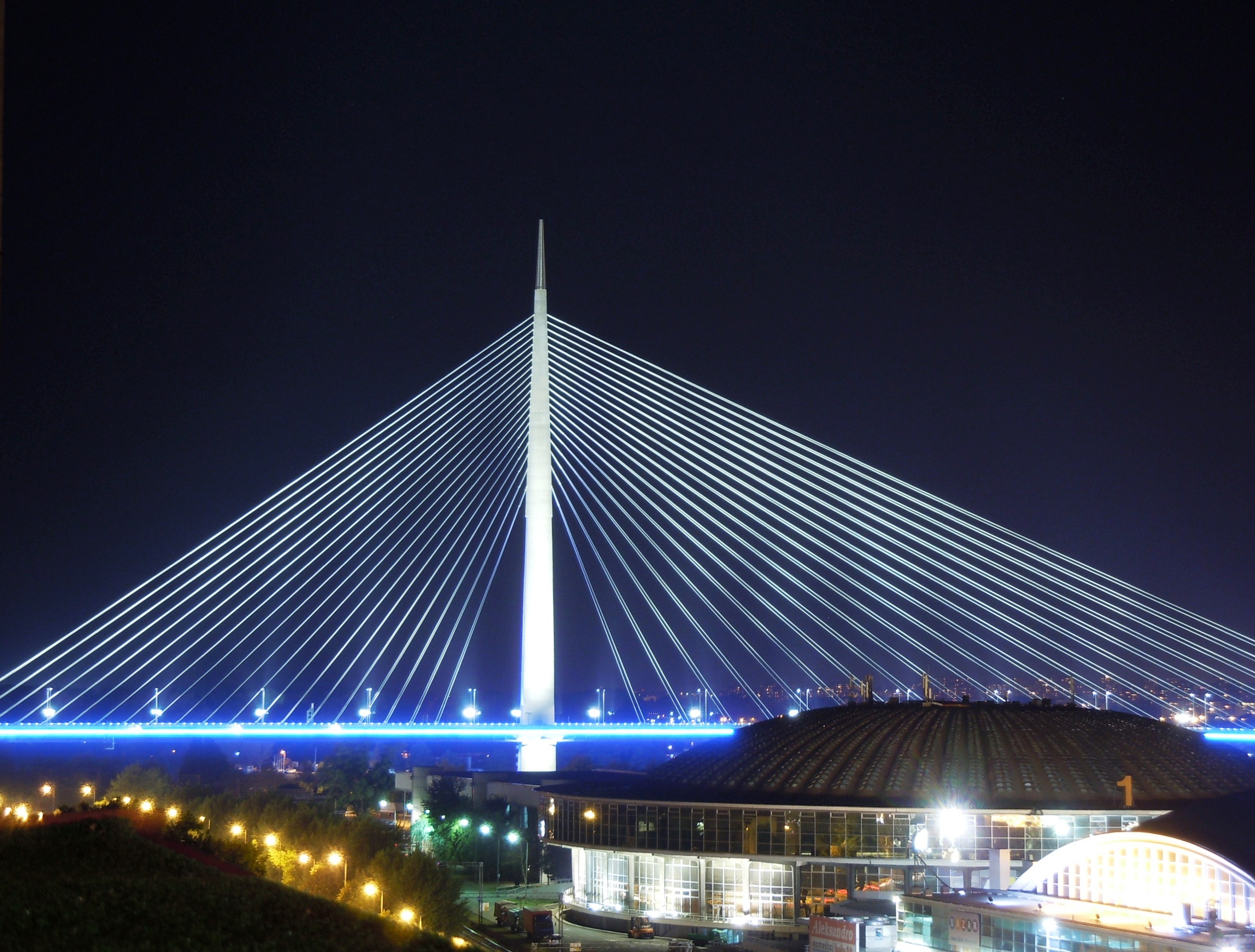
Ada Bridge by Viktor Markelj and Peter Gabrijelčić in Belgrade, 2011

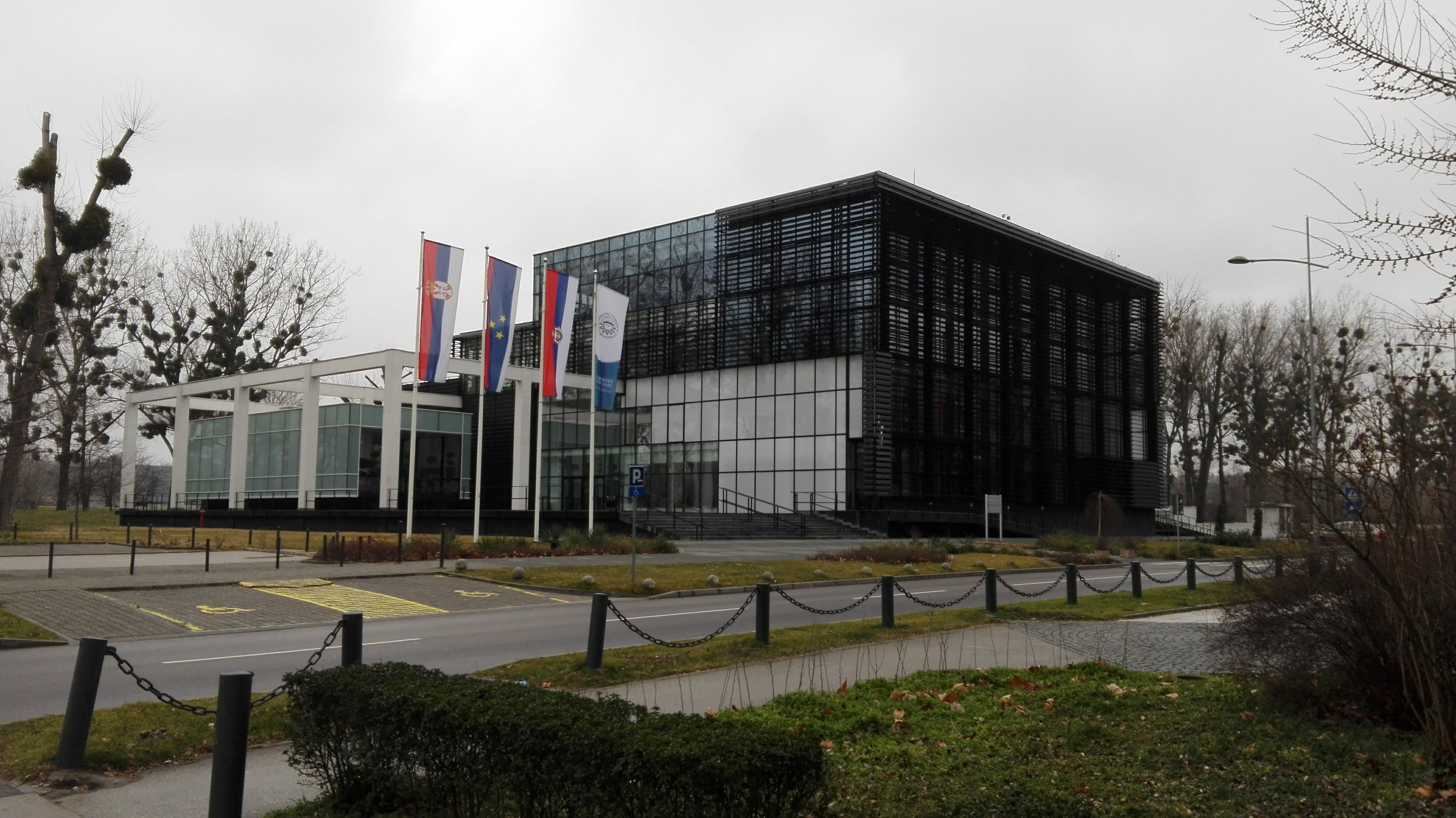
Rektorat of the University of Novi Sad by Darko Reba and Igor Maraš, 2013

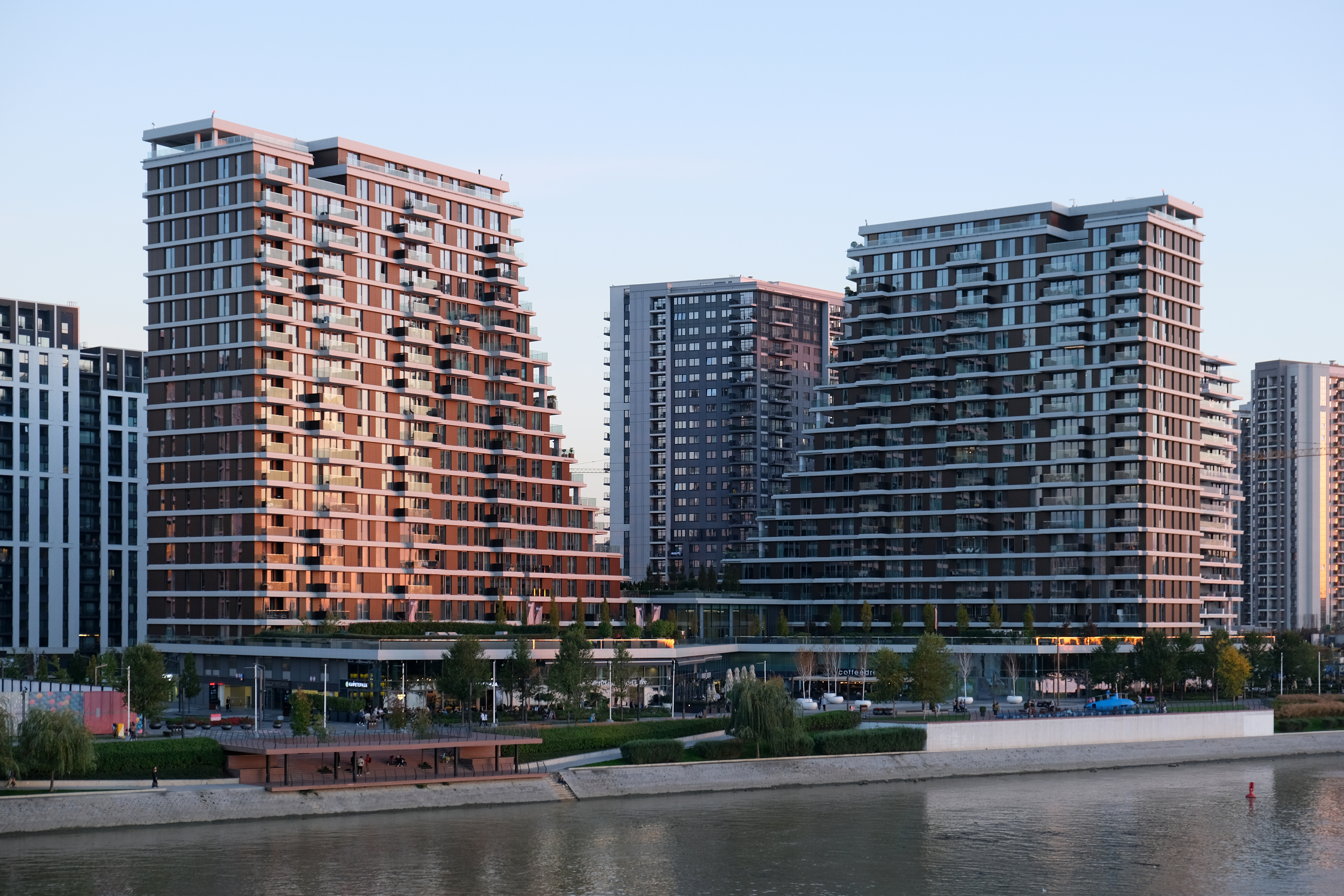
Belgrade Waterfront, 2014-ongoing

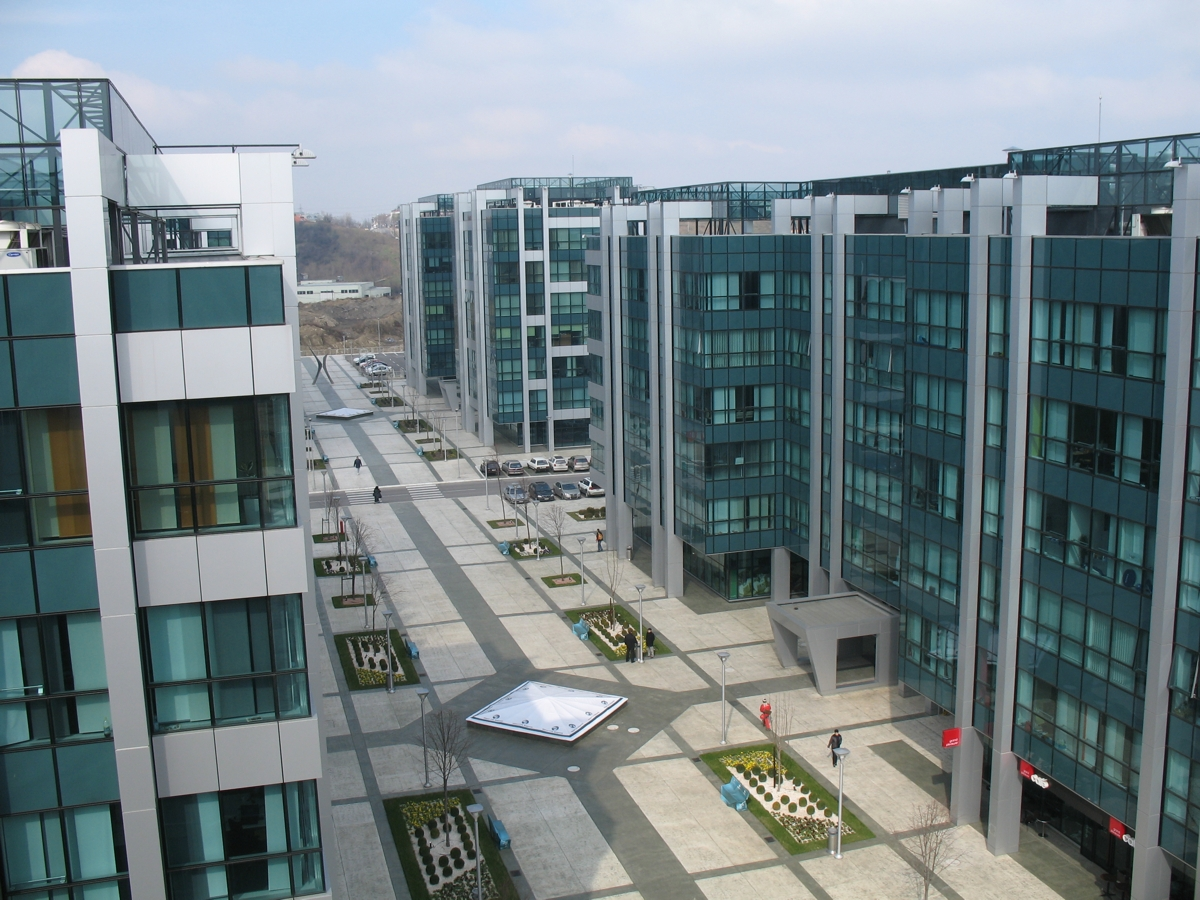
Airport City Belgrade, 2016

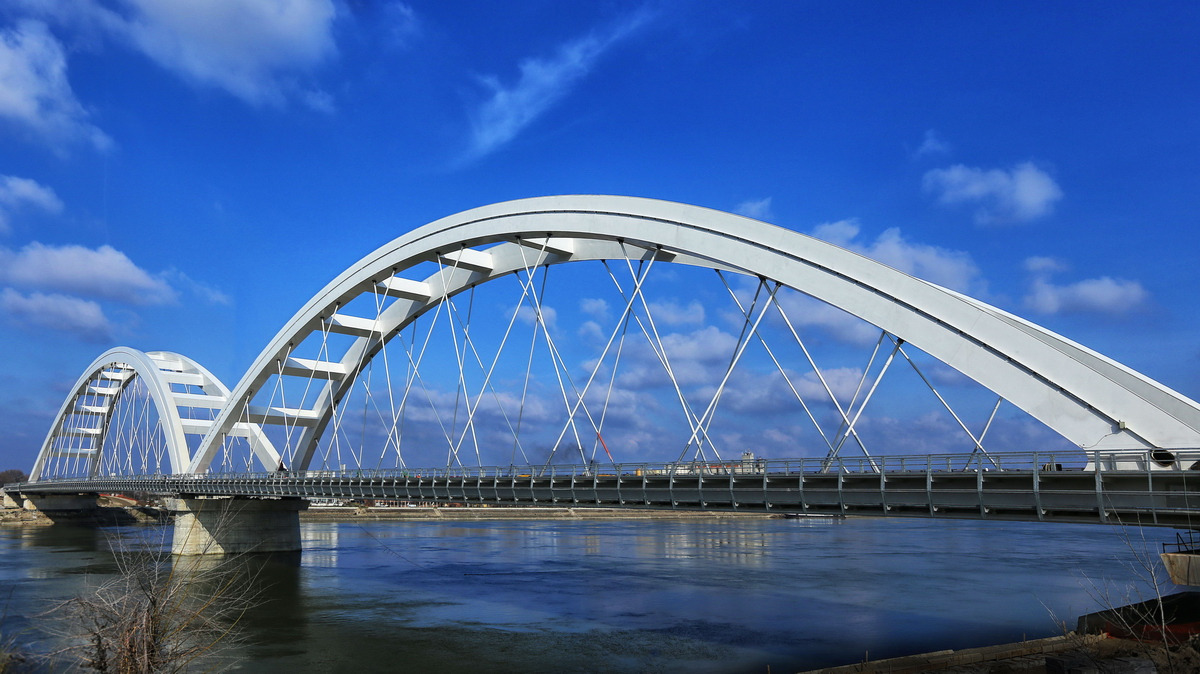
New Žeželj Bridge by Aleksandar Bojović in Novi Sad, 2018

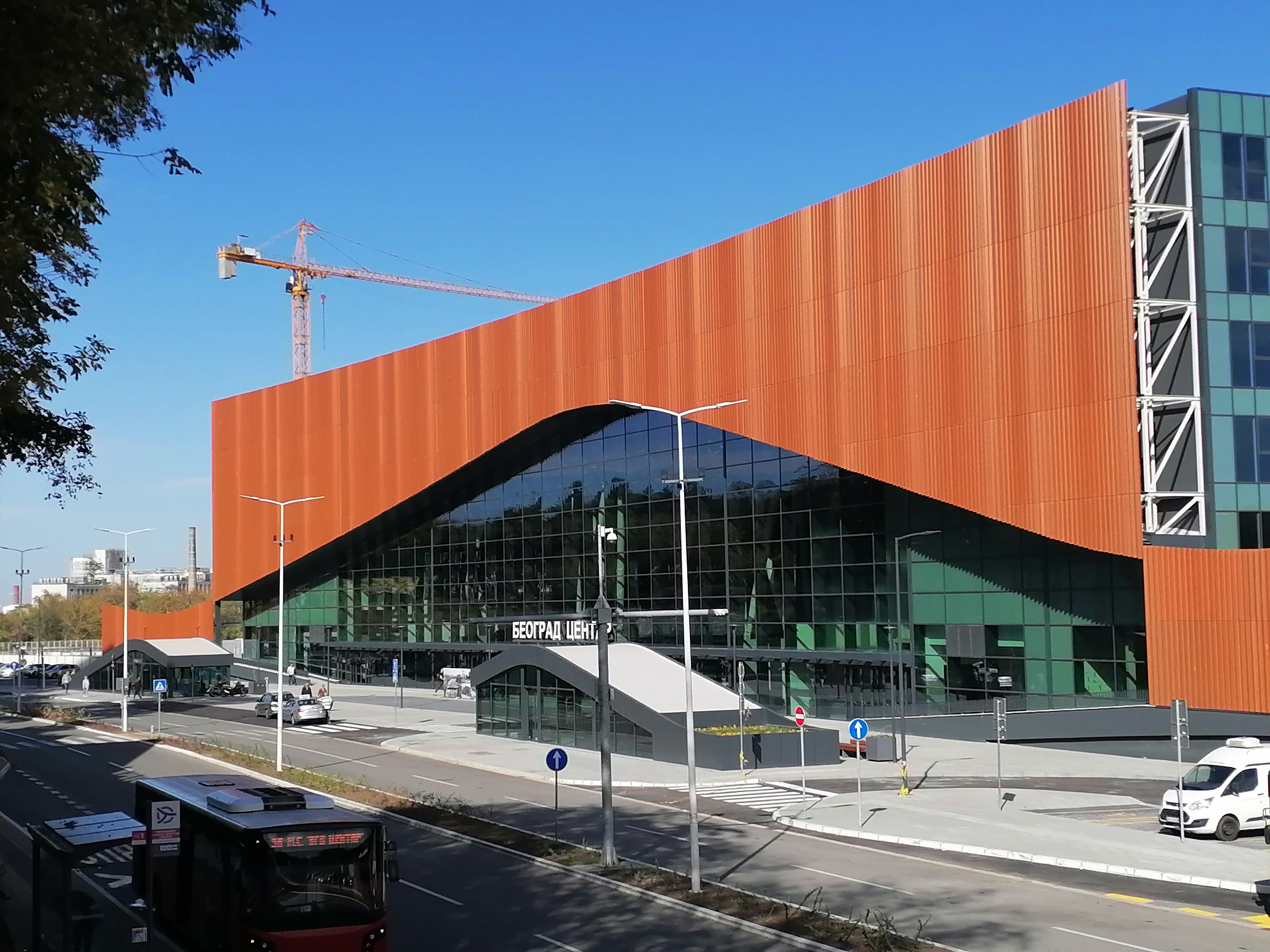
Belgrade Centre railway station by Gojko Radić, 2018-ongoing

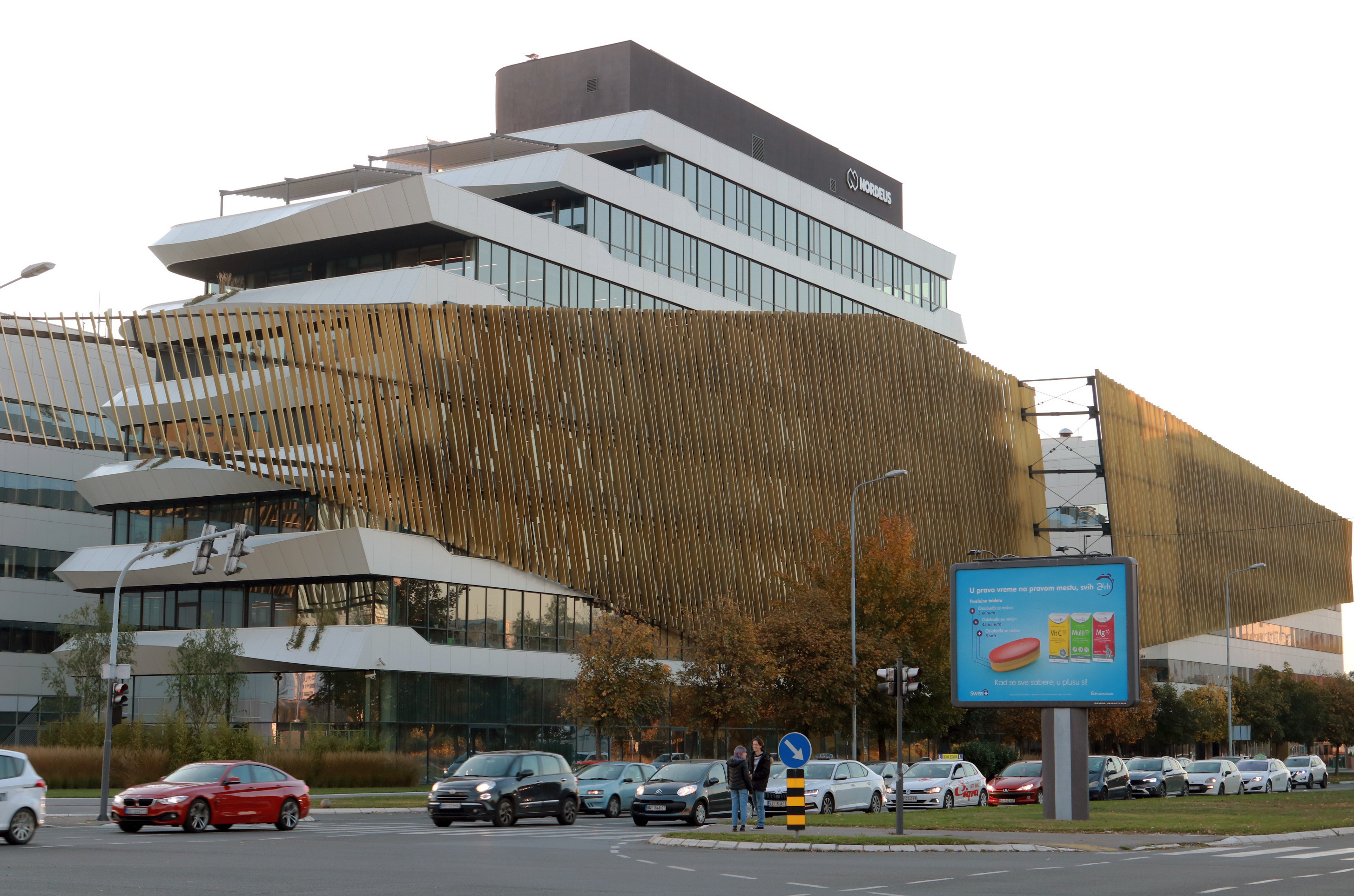
Nordeus HQ in Belgrade, 2019

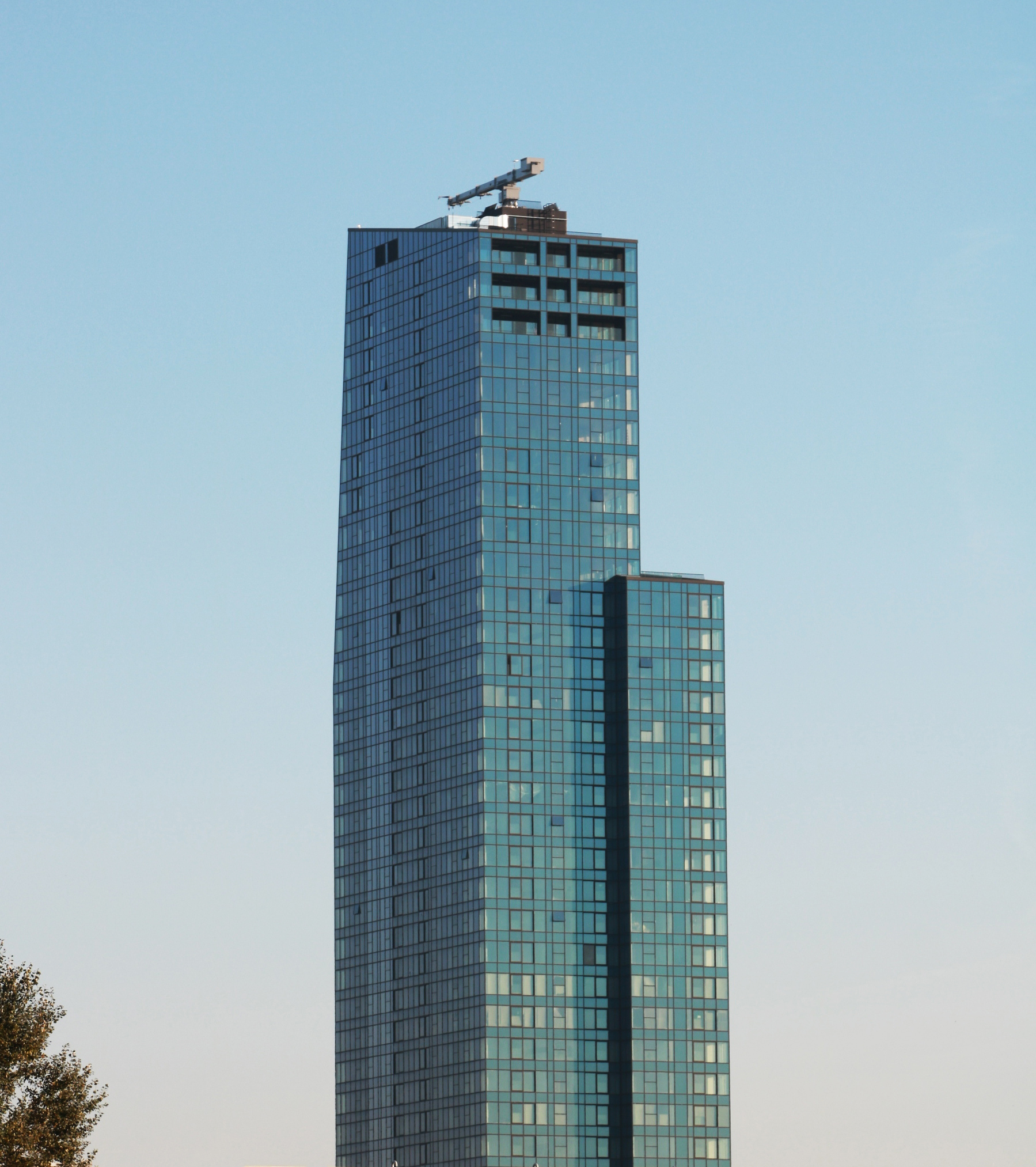
West 65 by Fletcher-Priest Company and PSP-Farman Holding in Belgrade, 2021

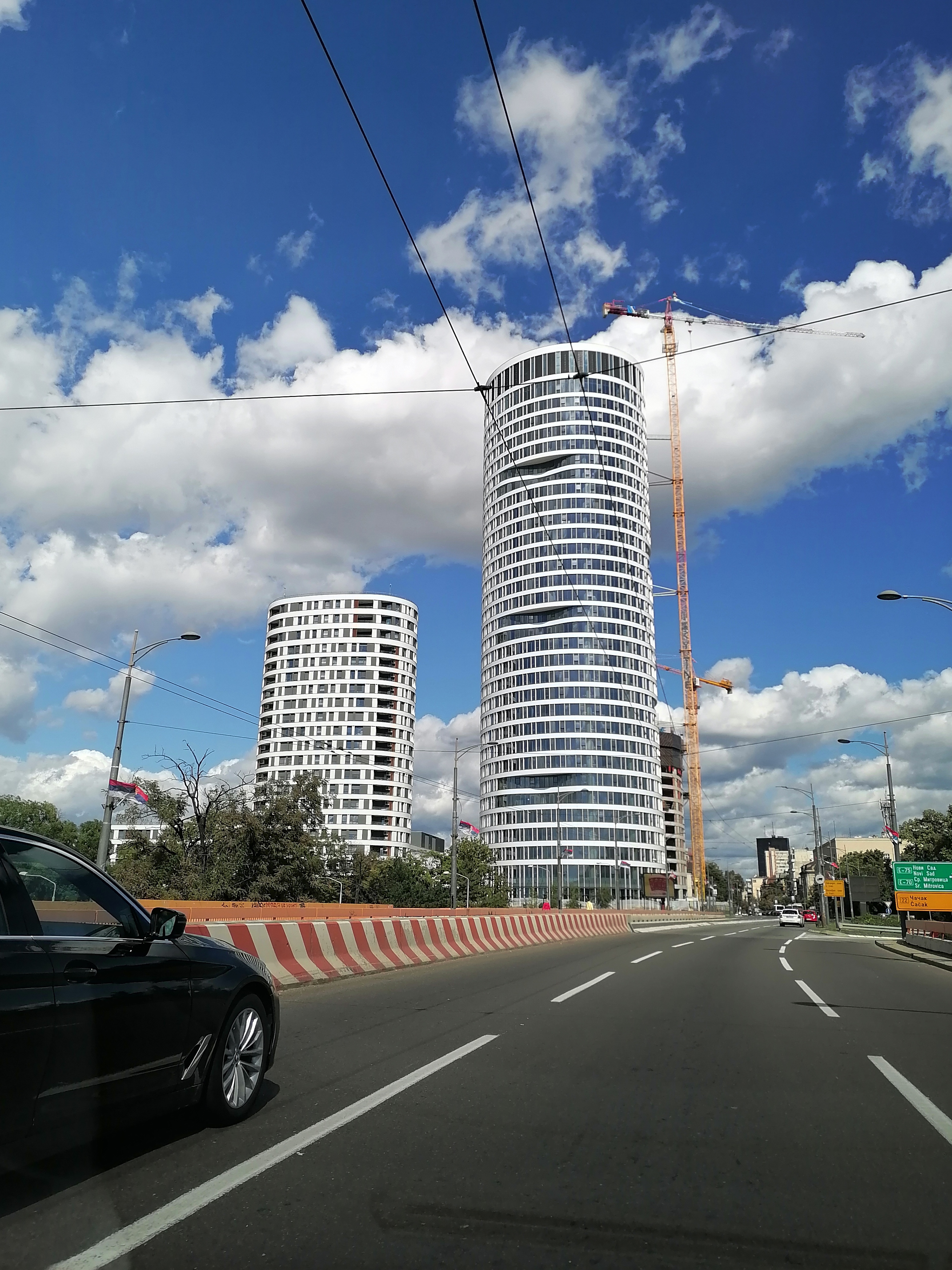
Skyline Belgrade, 2024

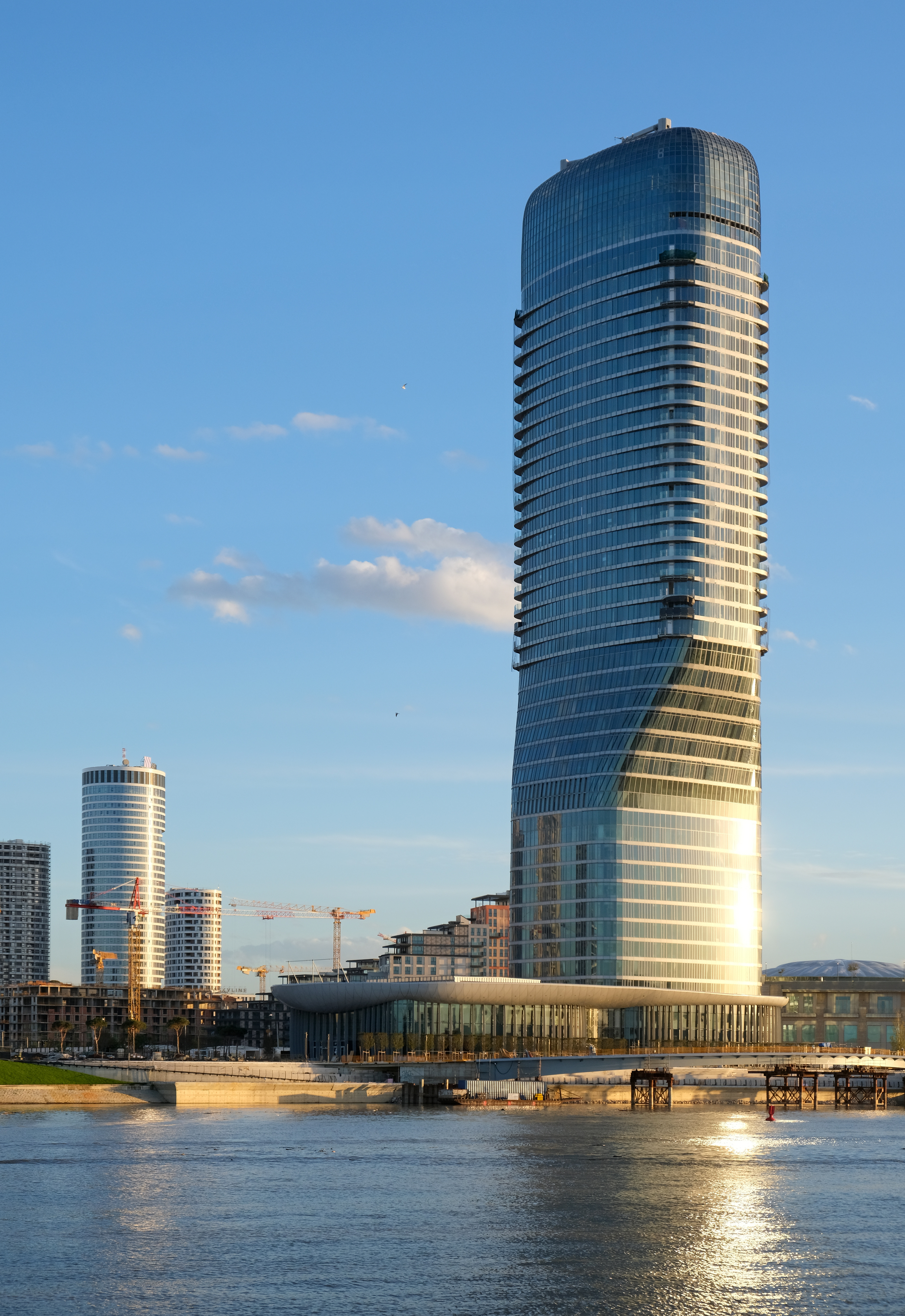
Belgrade Tower by Skidmore, Owings & Merrill, 2024

== See also ==
- Architecture of Belgrade
- Tallest structures in Serbia
- Serbo-Byzantine architecture
