= List of Serbian architects =

This is a list of notable architects of Serb heritage or other ethnic backgrounds who are closely associated with Serbia and are considered integral to Serbian architectural legacy.

== A ==
- Milan Antonović (1850–1929)
- Ilija Arnautović (1924–2009)
- Louis D. Astorino
- Ivan Antić (1923–2005)

== B ==
- Aleksandar Bugarski (1835–1891)
- Petar Bajalović (1876–1947)
- Đura Bajalović (1879–1949)
- Bogdan Bogdanović (1922–2010)
- Jovanka Bončić-Katerinić (1887–1966)
- Dragiša Brašovan (1887–1965)
- Ksenija Bulatović (born 1967)

== D ==
- Aleksandar Đokić (1936–2002)
- Nikola Dobrović (1897–1967)
- Nikola Djordjević (19th century)
- Andreja Damjanović (1813–1878)
- Dragutin Djordjević (1866–1933)

== H ==
- Hadži-Neimar (1792–1870; see Nikola Živković)

== I ==
- Svetozar Ivačković (1844–1924)
- Olja Ivanjicki (1931–2009)

== J ==
- Franz Janke (1790–1860)
- Mihailo Janković (1911–1976)
- Konstantin Jovanović (1849–1923)
- Emilijan Josimović (1823–1897)
- Aljoša Josić (1921–2011)

== K ==
- Marko Kovač (born 1981)
- Branislav Kojić (1899–1986)
- Momir Korunović (1883–1969)
- Krstić Brothers (1899–1991) (1902–1978)
- Milica Krstić (1887–1964)

== L ==
- Dimitrije T. Leko (1863-1914)

== M ==
- Andrija Marković (1400-1438)
- Paskoje Miličević Mihov (c. 1440-1516)
- Dragutin Milutinović (1868-1941)
- Mihajlo Mitrović (1922−2018)

== N ==
- Jan Nevole (1812–1903)
- Jelisaveta Načić (1878–1955)
- Nikola Nestorović (1868–1957)
- Atanasije Nikolić (1803–1882)
- Vladimir Nikolić (1857–1922)

== P ==
- Branko Popović (1882–1944)
- Petar Popović (1873–1945)
- Jovan Prokopljević (born 1940)

== R ==
- Milorad Ruvidić (1863–1914)
- Ivanka Raspopović (1930–2015)
- Predrag Ristić (1931–2019)
- Ranko Radović (1935–2005)
- Vujadin Radovanović (born 1962)

== S ==
- Andra Stevanović (1859–1929)
- Bojan Stupica (1923–2016)
- Leonid Šejka (1932–1970)

== T ==
- Branko Tanazević (1876–1945)
- Momčilo Tapavica (1872–1949)
- Vladislav Titelbah (1847–1925)
- Stojan Titelbah (1877–1916)

== V ==
- Mihailo Valtrović (1839–1915)
- Danilo Vladisavljević (1871–1923)

== Z ==
- Hadži-Neimar (Nikola Živković) (1792–1870)
- Milan Zloković (1898–1965)

== See also ==
- Serbian architecture
- Architecture of Serbia
- List of architects
- List of Serbs
- List of people from Serbia
