= Serbo-Byzantine Revival architecture =

19th–20th century Serbian architectural style

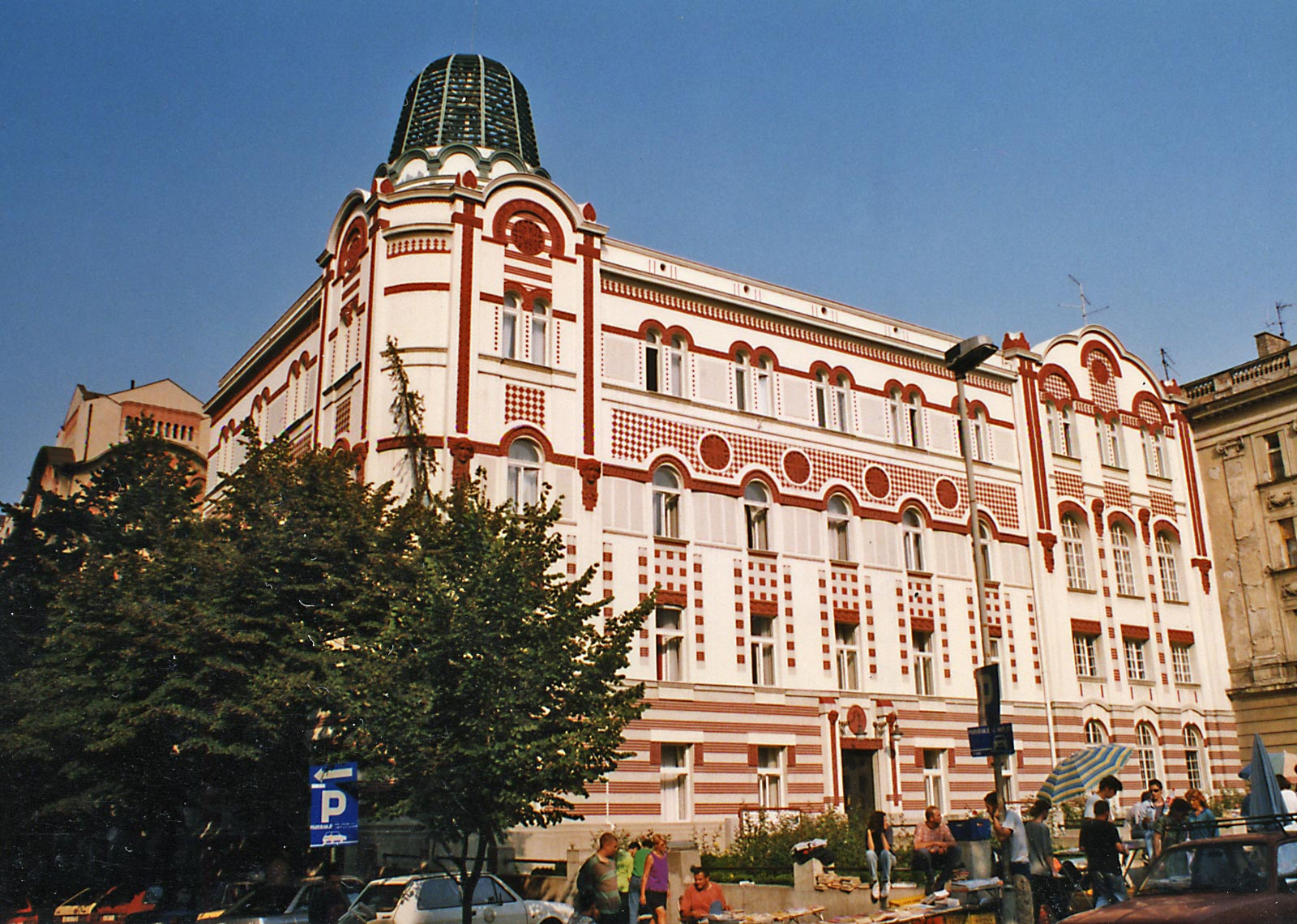
Old telephone exchange

The Modern Serbo-Byzantine architectural style, Neo-Byzantine architectural style or Serbian national architectural style is the style in Serbian architecture which lasted from the second half of the 19th century to the first half of the 20th century. This style originated in the tradition of medieval Serbian-Byzantine school and was part of international Neo-Byzantine style.

== History and characteristics ==
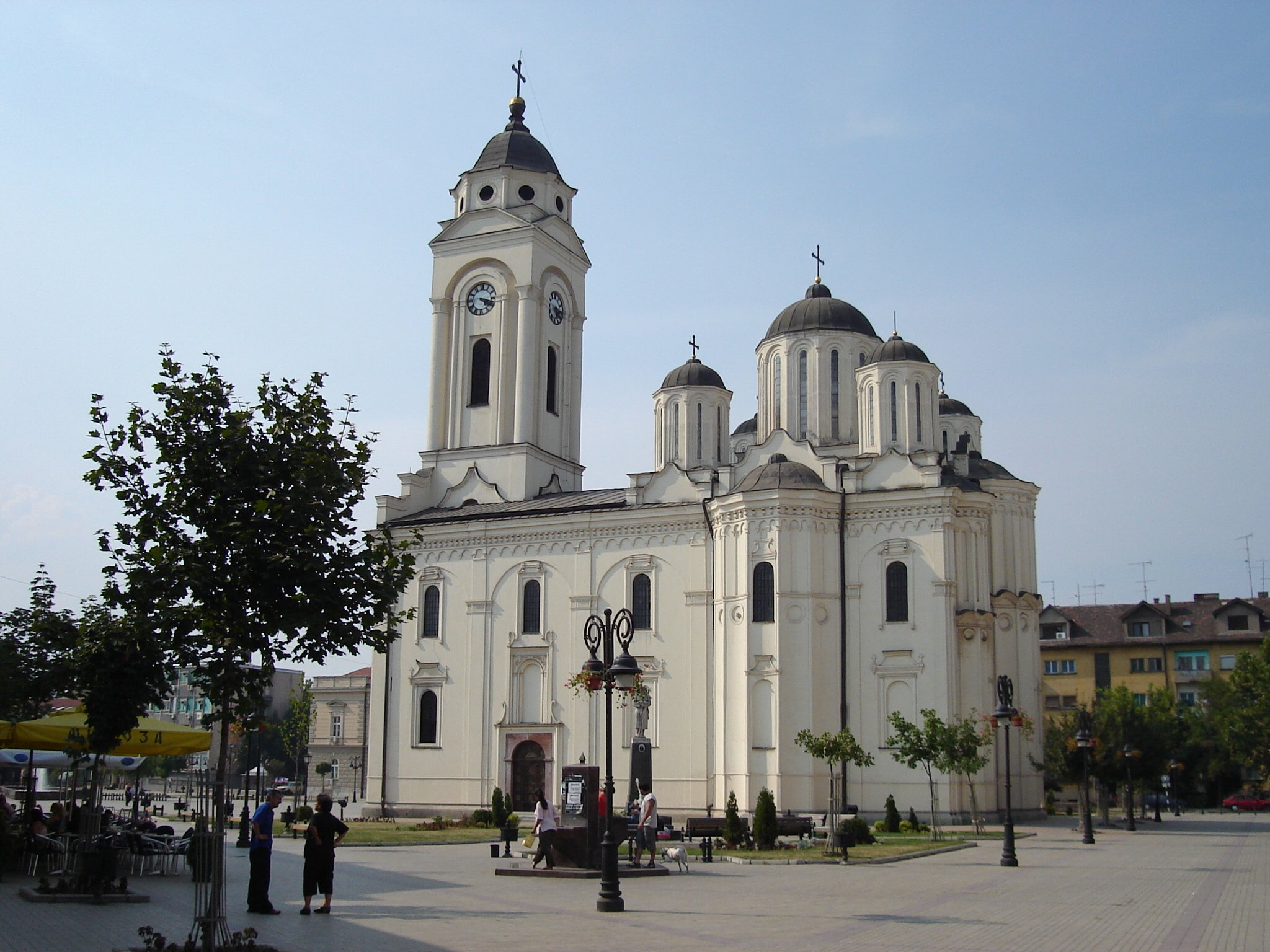
Church of Saint George, Smederevo

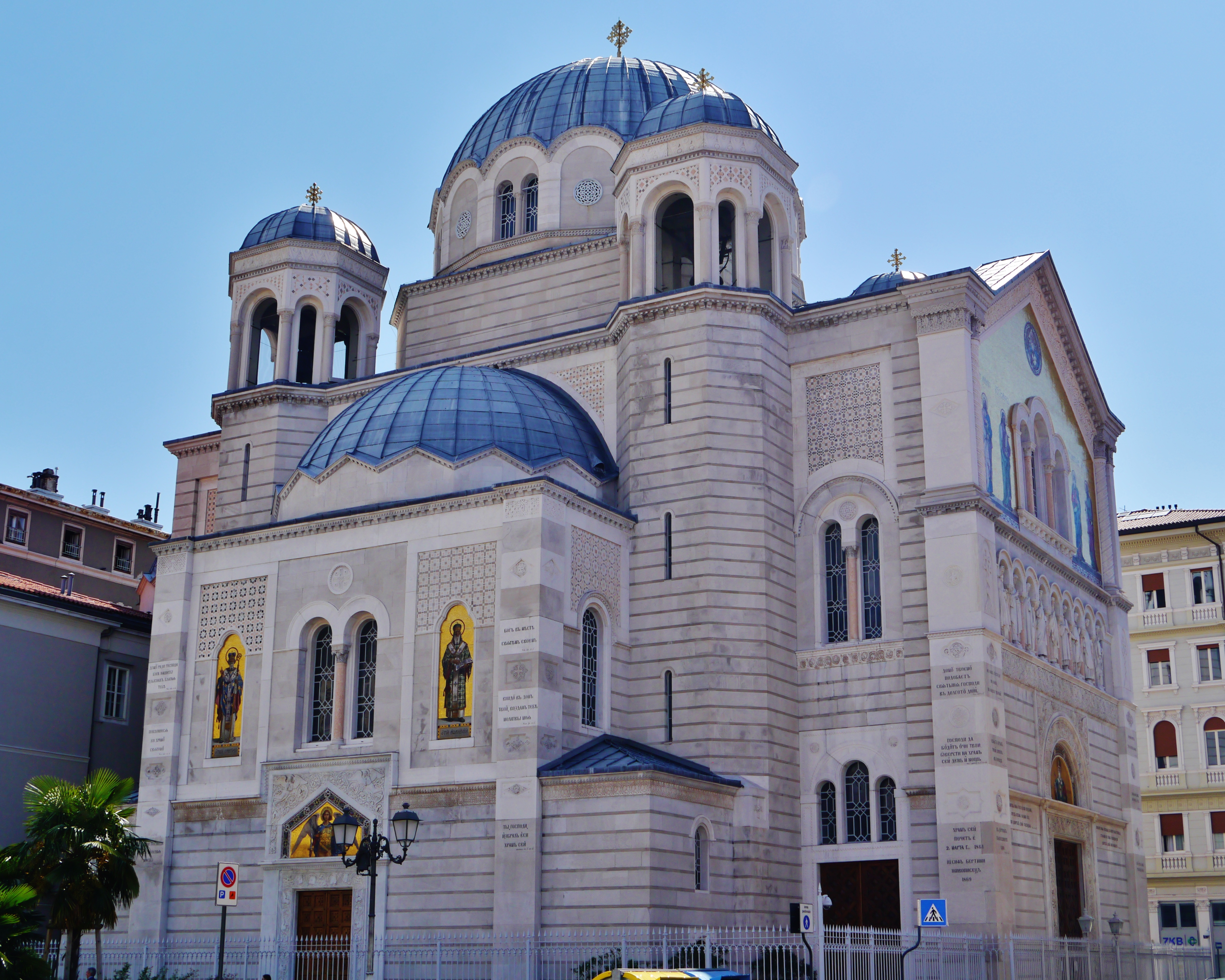
Saint Spyridon Church, Trieste

The beginning of the modern Serbian-Byzantine style lies in the romantic spirit, which was prevalent in Europe in the first half of the 19th century, and in the Serbian lands appeared by the mid-century and was alive to its last decades. The beginning of this style can be seen as "resistance" to newcomers' influences of the "western-style" (Classicism, Neo-Baroque) in the Principality of Serbia. The style is characterized by forms and decorations from the Serbian-Byzantine architectural heritage. This architectural approach is not strictly tied to the church architecture; in fact, the style was prosperous in secular architecture. It is also closely linked to the influence of Art Nouveau.

The Modern Serbo-Byzantine architectural style consists of three periods: the first or early period represents a combination of "western-style" with elements of Byzantine architecture. A typical example is the Church of St. George in Smederevo, where the longitudinal basis (characteristic of the West) appears five domes in the form of so-called. "Greek cross". The second period is related to the expansion and strengthening of Serbia, now as a kingdom (1882–1914). During this period, the style is "determined". Numbers of churches are being built, rarely other forms of construction. Examples outside the territory of the Kingdom of Serbia are rare. The third and final period is related to the time between the two world wars, when there was a sudden expansion of the style across the whole of the Kingdom of Serbs, Croats and Slovenes, later Yugoslavia, although its presence was much more dominant in the east, "Serbian" (mostly Central Serbia) part of the work of the Kingdom. Examples of the western part of the Kingdom of Yugoslavia are rare and are mainly related to specific examples of church architecture of the Serbian Orthodox Church. In addition, there are examples related to the Serbs in the diaspora, like the Church of St. Spyridon in Trieste, designed by Carlo Maciachini. Buildings in this period are equally religious and secular.

The Second World War and after was a turning point; after the war with the advent of communism, all forms of historicism in Serbian architecture are discarded, including Serbo-Byzantine style. After the fall of socialist Yugoslavia, Serbo-Byzantine style returned through the construction of new religious buildings such as churches and monasteries.

== Architects ==
Prominent architects of this style are (ordered by the time in which they were active):

- Jan Nevole
- Andreja Damjanović
- Aleksandar Deroko
- Momir Korunović
- Svetozar Ivačković
- Vladimir Nikolić
- Jovan Ilkić
- Dušan Živanović
- Andra Stevanović
- Branko Tanazević
- Petar Popović
- Jovan Novaković
- Dragutin Maslać
- Dragutin Inkiostri Medenjak
- Vasilije Androsov
- Grigorije Samojlov
- Brothers Krstić

== Examples ==
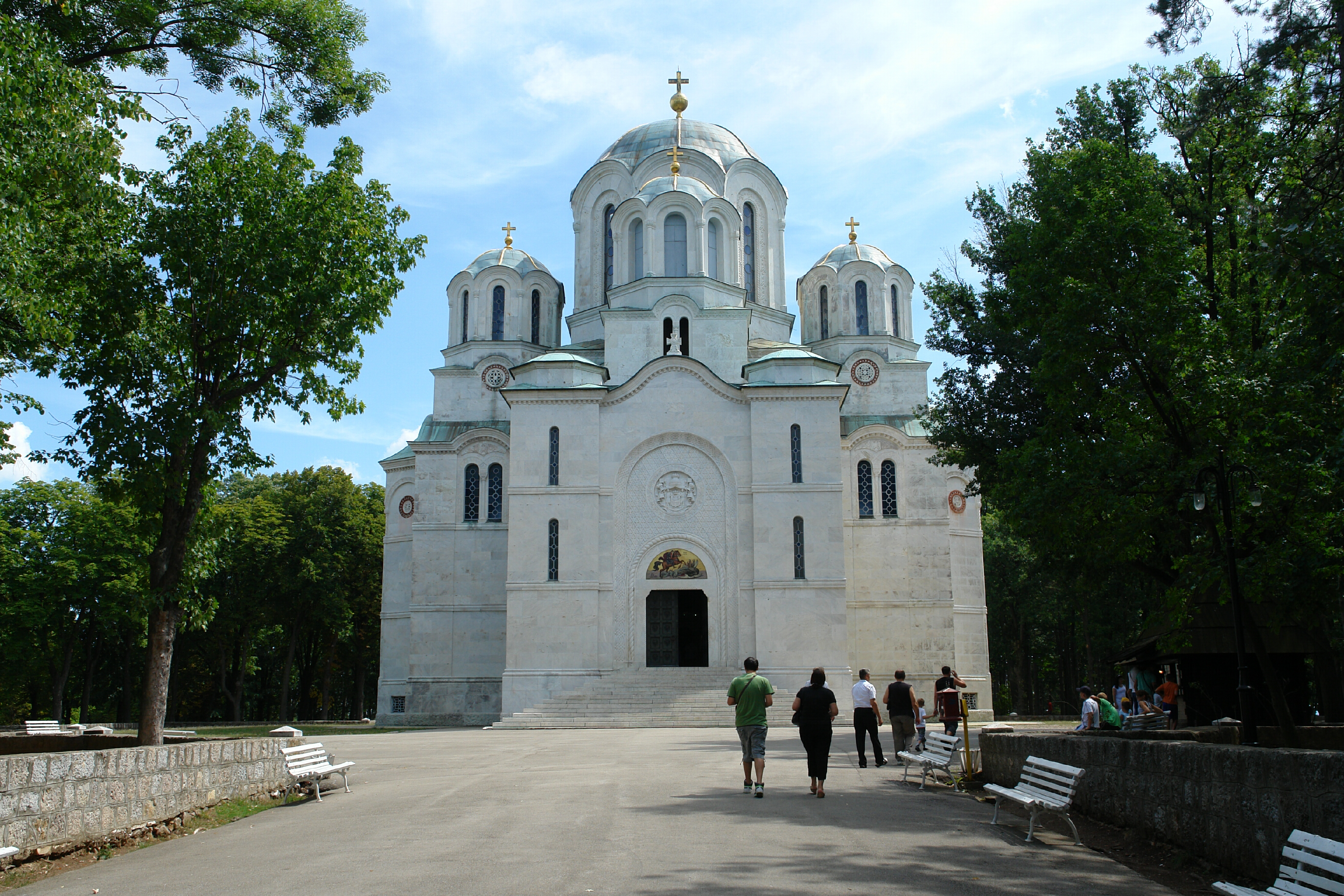
St George's Church, Oplenac

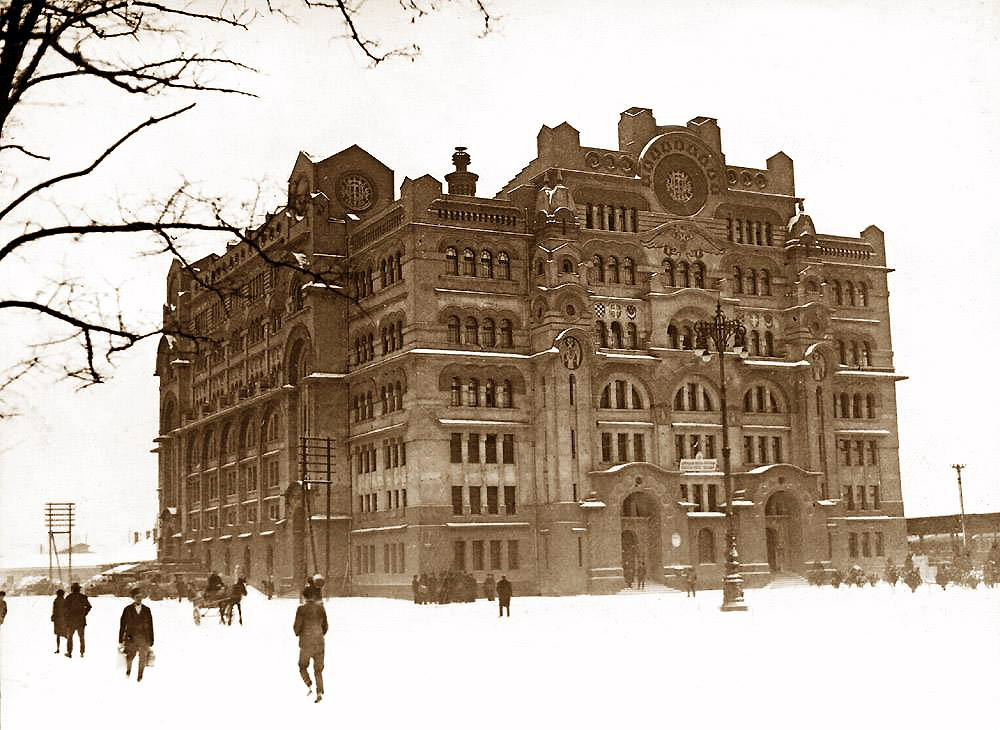
Old Post Office, Belgrade

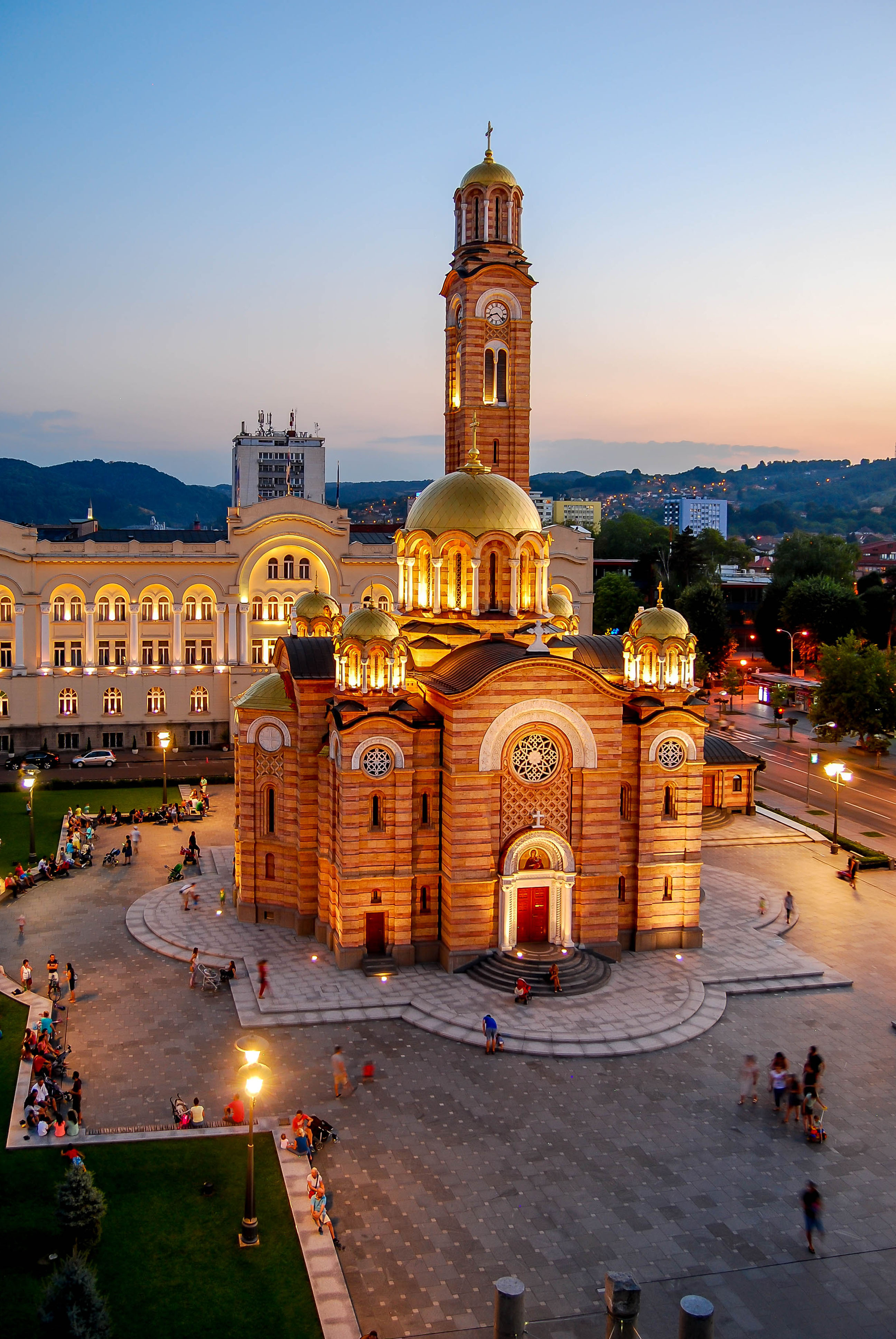
Cathedral of Christ the Saviour, Banja Luka

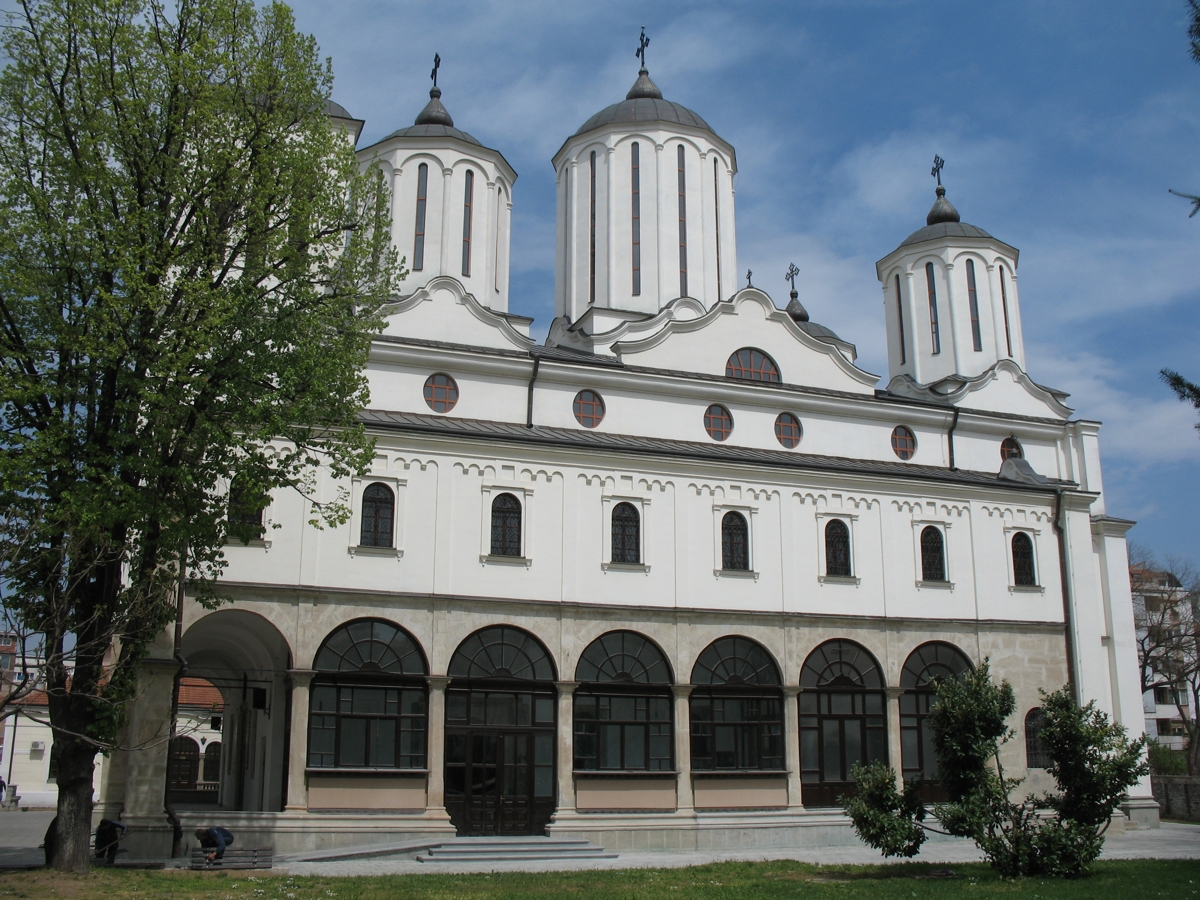
Serbian Orthodox Cathedral in Niš

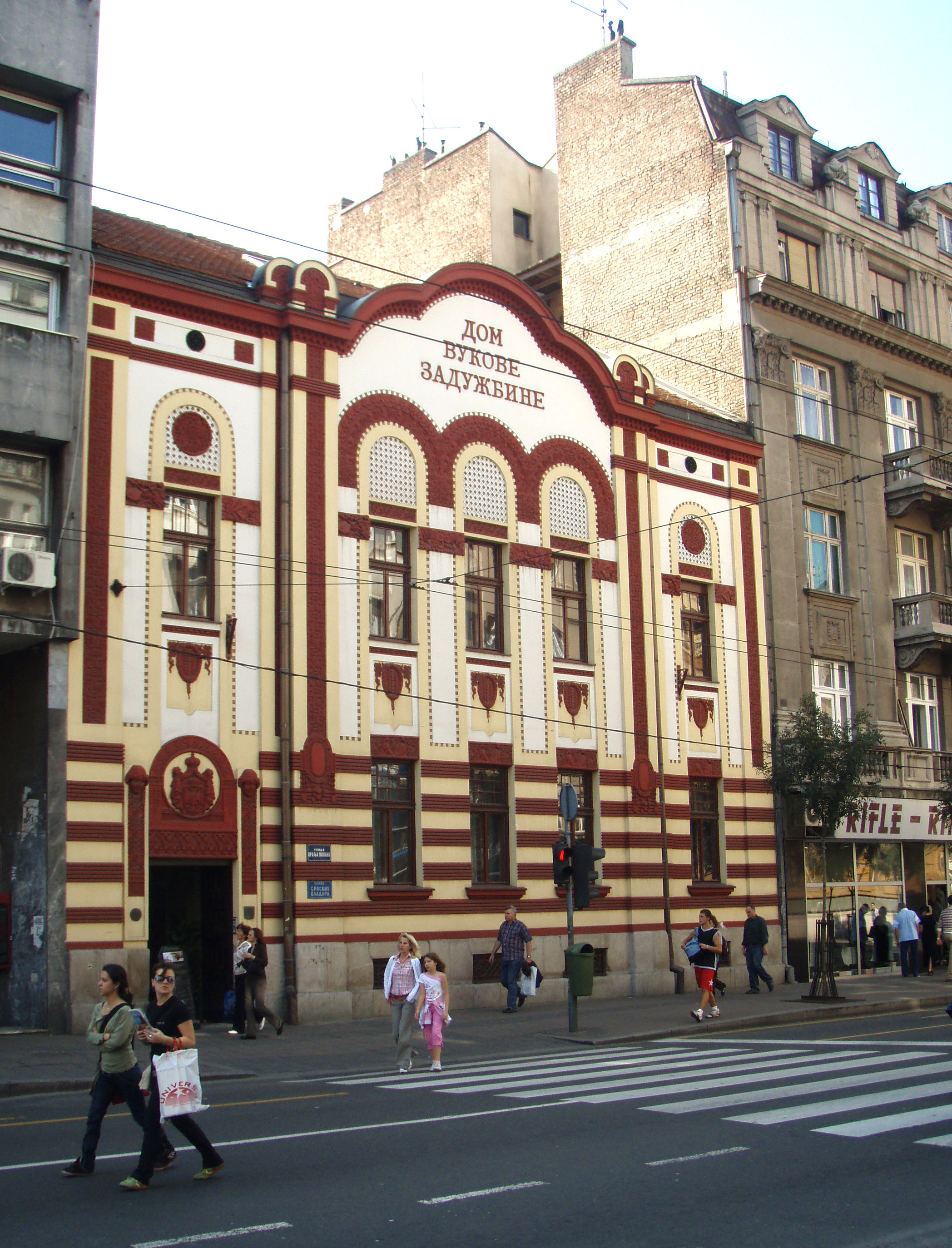
Vuk's foundation

=== Early period (around 1850-1880) ===
- Church of Saint George in Smederevo by Andrey Damyanov
- Holy Trinity Cathedral in Niš by Andrey Damyanov
- Holy Trinity Cathedral in Vranje by Andrey Damyanov
- Cathedral of the Nativity of the Theotokos in Sarajevo by Andrey Damyanov
- Holy Trinity Cathedral in Mostar by Andrey Damyanov
- Church of the Ascension of the Lord in Belgrade by Pavle Stanišić and Jovan Ristić

=== Middle period (1880-1914) ===
- Church of Saint Spyridon in Trieste by Carlo Maciachini
- Old church in Pančevo by Svetozar Ivačković
- Church of St. Elijah in Leskovac by Svetozar Ivačković
- Church at the New Cemetery in Belgrade by Svetozar Ivačković
- Church of Saint Peter in Jagodina by Svetozar Ivačković
- Holy Trinity Church in Paraćin by Jovan Ilkić
- Saint George Cathedral in Kruševac by Dušan Živanović
- Church of St. Archangel Michael in Herceg Novi
- Church of Saint Sava in Kosovska Mitrovica by Andra Stevanović
- Church of Saint George at Oplenac in Topola by Andra Stevanović
- Old Telephone Exchange Building in Belgrade by Branko Tanazević
- Vuk Foundation House in Belgrade by Branko Tanazević
- District Office Building in Vranje by Petar Popović

=== Late period (1914-1941) ===
- Grammar school in Čačak by Dragutin Maslać
- Grammar school in Sremska Mitrovica by Momir Korunović
- Church of the Ascension of the Lord in Krupanj by Momir Korunović
- Ministry of Post in Belgrade by Momir Korunović
- Sokol House in Bijeljina by Momir Korunović
- Old Post Office in Belgrade by Momir Korunović
- Cathedral of Christ the Saviour in Banja Luka by Dušan Živanović
- Church of Saint Sava by Bogdan Nestorović and Aleksandar Deroko
- White Palace in Dedinje, Belgrade by Živojin Nikolić, Viktor Lukomski and Nikolay Krasnov
- House of Elezović in Belgrade by Aleksandar Deroko
- Palace of the Patriarchate in Belgrade by Viktor Lukomski
- Church of Saint Mark in Belgrade by Branko Krstić and Petar Krstić
- Church of Sts. Constantine and Helen in Požega by Vasilij Adrosov
- Sokol House in Sombor by J. Bazler and V. Sabo
- Banski Dvor in Banja Luka
- Serbian World War I Mausloeum in Vido near Corfu by Nikolay Krasnov
- Đorđević House on Topčider in Belgrade by Branislav Kojić
- Hotel in Sopoćani near Novi Pazar by Dragiša Brašovan

== See also ==
- Raška architectural school
- Serbo-Byzantine architecture
- Morava architectural school
