= Branko Tanazević =

Serbian architect

Branko Tanazević (Бранко Таназевић) (Čakovo, Banat, 1876 - Belgrade, Kingdom of Yugoslavia, 1945) was one of the most famous Serbian architects of the Art Nouveau and Serbo-Byzantine Revival, also known as the Serbian national style, which he successfully combined in his works. He graduated from two faculties: the Technical Faculty in Belgrade, the Department of Mechanical Engineering and Architecture in Munich.

== Biography ==
Branko Tanazević's father was a doctor, originally from Vojvodina, then under Habsburg monarchy. At the invitation of a friend of the doctor and Prime Minister Vladan Đorđević, Branko Tanazević then moved to Serbia. His mother was from the family of Dositej Obradović. Branko Tanazević, the most expressive representative of the national style in Serbian architecture of the second half of the 19th century, also drew inspiration from profane folk architecture, looking at the Moravian house with arches, artistic embroidery and modern carpet weaving in Serbia.

He presented his ideas in professional periodicals, becoming, along with the decorator Dragutin Inkiostri Medenjak, the main ideologue of the national architectural called Serbo-Byzantine Revival. Hence, his buildings became synonymous with the "modern", instead of the conservative and mimetic direction of the national style.

In addition to architectural creation, Tanazević was also a professor at the Faculty of Architecture at the University of Belgrade, where he taught: Ornamentation, Decoration, Modeling and Urban Planning.

As a teacher of the then Architectural Department of the Technical Faculty, Branko Tanazević and Nikola Nestorović designed the building of technical faculties in Belgrade. It was built in 1931, though construction began in the autumn of 1925.

== Works ==
In his first part-the building of the Telephone exchange, Kosovska 47, in Belgrade (1905-1908), Tanazević successfully reconciled tradition and modernity, placing on its asymmetrical façade, finished with an angular ribbed Art Nouveau dome, various "Neo-Moravian" openings, polychrome surfaces and ceramic plastic motifs. Large windows with a wide projection occupy significant areas of the wall canvas, while the shallow plastic, reduced to the flat facade, is composed of pseudo-medieval rosettes and chessboards. Along with the joints on the ground floor, which allude to Byzantine construction and intertwined ornamentation, a colourful structure was created, similar to the achievements of Serbian carpet weaving at the time. The attic wreath was breached again, and the openings were multiplied numerically and dimensionally crushed in accordance with the international practice of Art Nouveau from the ground floor to the top.

In the asymmetrical composition of the façades of the Ministry of Education such as the Telefonska centrala (Old Telephone Exchange, 1908) and Vukova zadužbina (Vuk's Endowment House) in 1913, with non-medieval polychromy, intertwined ornamentation, three-leaf gable and the coat of arms of the Kingdom of Serbia were skillfully combined with Art Nouveau pilasters, plastic and elevation finishes. Tanazević used exciting light-dark contrasts, accentuated on the polychrome carpet facades of public buildings, including the house of Jovan Nikolić and Maksim Nikolić (1912-1914), where the relief of Saint George clearly recognizes the ideology of the national style in the gable of the composition and the colour derived from the Serbian tricolour.

Of the fifty or so Tanazević projects, the house of the Nikolić brothers, at 11 Njegoševa Street in Belgrade, should certainly be singled out. An interesting, white-red facade in a combination of Art Nouveau and Moravian style, is one of the most beautiful decorations of Cvetni trg.

== See also ==
Architects of the Belle Époque:

- Jovan Ilkić
- Milan Antonović
- Andra Stevanović
- Nikola Nestorović
- Aleksandar Bugarski
- Stojan Titelbach
- Milan Antonović
- Danilo Vladisavljević
- Milorad Ruvidić
- Đura Bajalović, brother of Petar
- Milan Kapetanović
- Dragutin Dragiša Milutinović
- Dragutin Đorđević
- Petar Bajalović, brother of Đura
- Krstić Brothers
