= House of Leona Panajot =

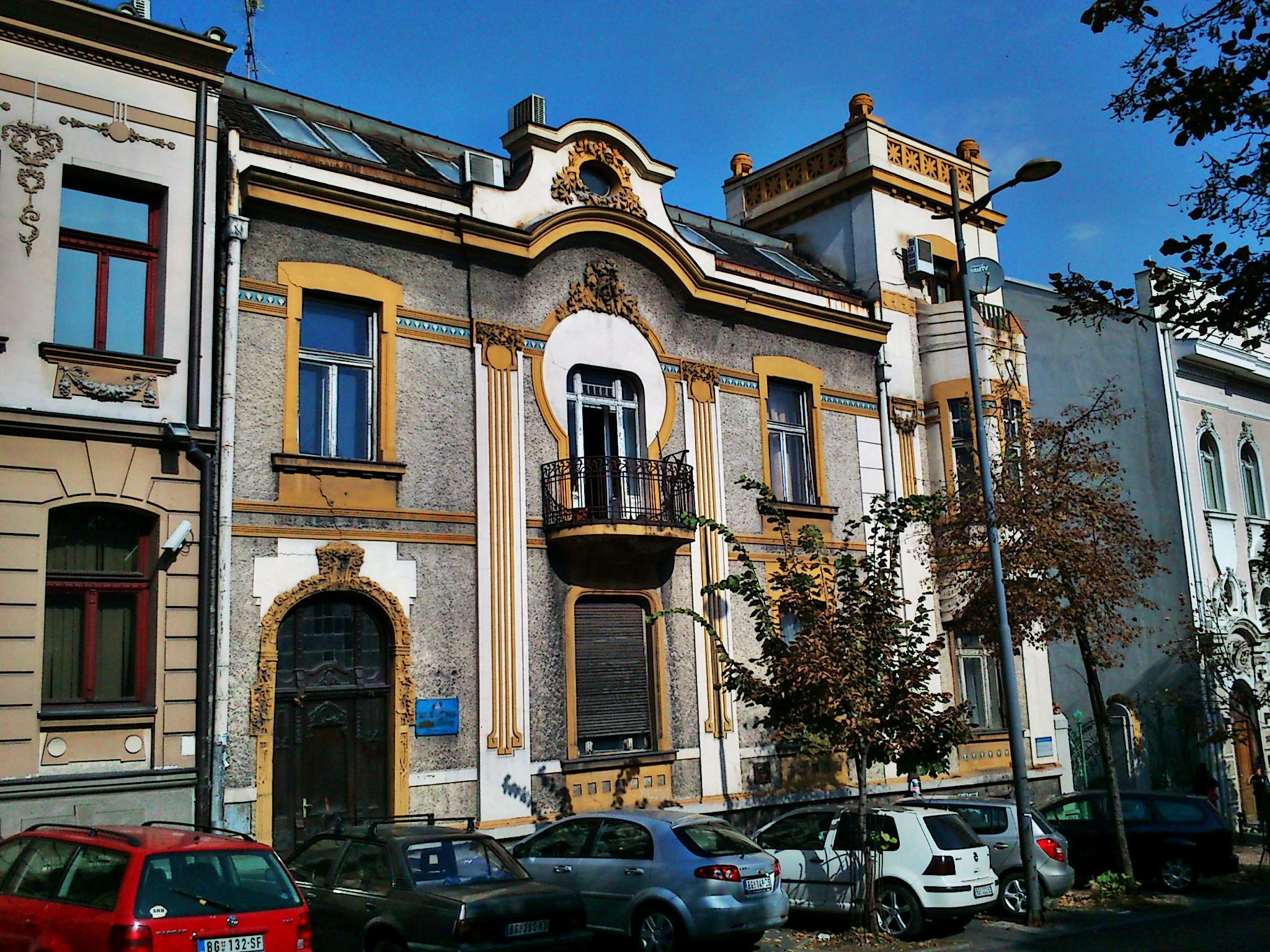
- House of Leona Panajot
- Interactive map of the House of Leona Panajot area

General information
- Type: Cultural monument
- Location: 14 Kalemegdan 11000, Stari Grad, Belgrade, Serbia
- Coordinates: 44°49′N 20°28′E
- Completed: 1908

House of Leona Panajot is at 31 Francuska Street in Belgrade, in the city municipality of Stari grad. It was built in 1908, and represents immovable cultural property as a cultural monument.

The building was constructed as a multi-storey detached house by the architect Đura Bajalović. It consists of a basement, ground floor, first floor and attic. Architecturally, it is designed in the style of Art Nouveau. As a pronounced work of this style, the house was presented at the Fourth Yugoslav Art Exhibition in Belgrade in 1912. His brother Petar Bajalović designed the Serbian Pavilion for the International Art Exhibition in Rome in 1911.

Art Nouveau features of this facade are the vertical division with shallow pilasters, asymmetry, horizontal cornices which do not reflect the level of internal division of levels, shallow embossed floral decoration, segmental-arched shapes of window frames, and polychrome. Especially interesting is the square tower on the corner of the building, with a prominent oriel window. A rare example of Belgrade Art Nouveau is the nearly circular box that frames the central balcony opening on the floor. Decorative treatment is characterized by rich floral ornaments both on the façade in the mortar, and on the door panels, with expertly executed and harmoniously fit artisan details. The gateway to the courtyard of wrought iron is also a prominent example of Art Nouveau. With its harmonious architectural design and rich plastic, it stands out as a representative example of an urban residential house of early 20th century, with rare consistently applied Art Nouveau style in Belgrade.

The character of the building stems from the fact that it represents an outstanding work of art of the famous Belgrade architect and that is of particular importance for the development of the architecture of Belgrade in the first decade of the 20th century.

House of Leona Panajot was declared a cultural monument in 1997 (Decision, "Official Gazette of RS", No.51/97).

== See more ==
- List of cultural monuments in Belgrade
