= Faculty of Law Building in Belgrade =

Building of the Faculty of Law in Belgrade
- Зграда Правног факултета у Београду
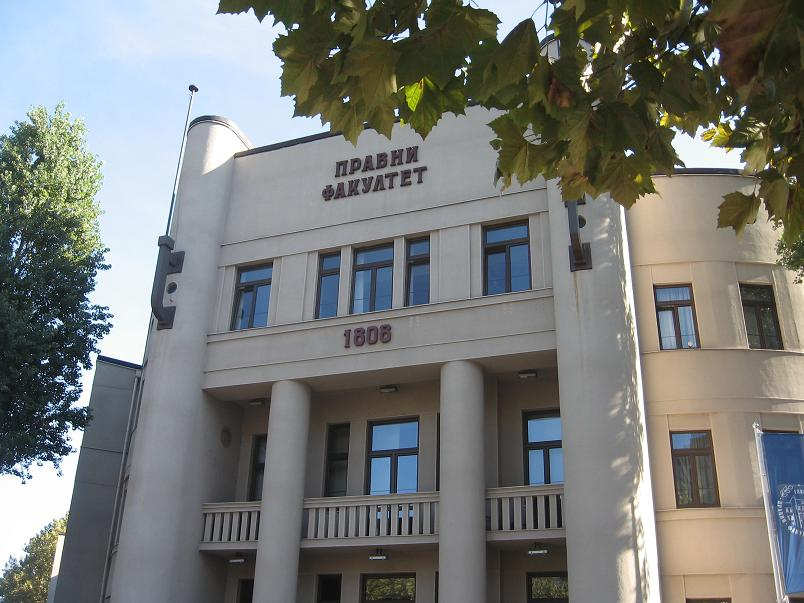
- Faculty of Law Building in Belgrade
- Interactive map of the Building of the Faculty of Law in Belgrade area

General information
- Type: Cultural monument
- Architectural style: Modern
- Location: Bulevar Kralja Aleksandra 67, Palilula, Belgrade, Serbia
- Coordinates: 44.807265°N 20.47234°E
- Construction started: 1936
- Completed: 1940
- Inaugurated: 1940; 86 years ago

Design and construction
- Architects: Petar Bajalović, Petar Anagnosti
- Other designers: Svetozar Jovanović

Faculty of Law Building in Belgrade is at 67 Boulevard of Kralj Aleksandar, Palilula, Belgrade, Serbia. A work of architectural urban value, as well as an angular building, built in accordance with the modernist concept, which significantly expands and articulates the wider space, as the first building built solely for the purposes of the Faculty of Law, one of the oldest institutions of higher education in Serbia, also has cultural and historical value. The building of the Faculty of Law was declared a cultural monument.

== History ==
The idea of raising the building comes from 1933, when Prof. Arch. Svetozar Jovanović was called for the project design. The location where the building was erected was intended for erecting university buildings with the General Plan of 1923, as well as the previous decisions of the Belgrade municipality from 1920 to 1922, by which the location near Vuk's Monument was ceded to the University of Belgrade. The construction began in 1921, initially by designing the University Library and by designing the building of the Technical Faculty in 1925. The University Library was completed in 1926 according to the design by architects Nikola Nestorović and Dragutin Đorđević, and the building of the Technical Faculty was completed in 1931. The first project, which was not realized, for the building of the Faculty of Law was done by Prof. Arch. Svetozar Jovanović in the spirit of academic style, and it was balanced with the already constructed buildings of the University Library and the Technical Faculty.

== Architecture ==
The building of the Faculty of Law in Belgrade was built from 1936 to 1940 by the architect Petar Bajalović, with the assistance and development of the project by the architect Prof. Petar Anagnosti. The base of the building is in the shape of a rounded triangle with an emphasized main foyer on the corner. It was made in modernist style with flat facades without ornamental design, emphasized only by the horizontals of shallow cornices under the windows. The avant-corpses on the street highlight the verticals in the form of inter-window flat pilasters. The facade towards the park and the Hotel "Metropol" is extremely functionalist, with flat wall masses and window openings. The external facades of the building (to the streets and park) were coated with artificial stone, while the plinth part, which extends to the window of the ground floor, was covered with slabs of natural bossed stone. The entrance portico, which is the most characteristic emphasis of the facade, and the stairs are tiled with natural stone. The portico, which emphasizes the corner with its monumentality and treatment, represents a contrast with the calm facade and contributes to the impression of dynamism of the entire facility. Additional dynamism of the entire corpus of the building is provided by the confronted cubic and round forms that follow one another.

== Interior ==
The stairs from the vestibule lead to a large amphitheater that can accommodate 800 listeners. On the floor, there is a smaller amphitheater for about 300 listeners. Both wings of the building house halls for seminars and cabinets.

== Value ==
The building of the Faculty of Law is a work of architectural and urban value, as an angular building constructed in accordance with the modernist concept, which significantly expands the space and articulates the wider space, initiating the complex part of university facilities. At the same time, it has cultural and historical value as a building built solely for the purposes of the Faculty of Law in Belgrade, which is still in the building.

== See also ==
- University of Belgrade Faculty of Law
