= Old Telephone Exchange, Belgrade =

Coordinates: 44.8120°N 20.4674°E

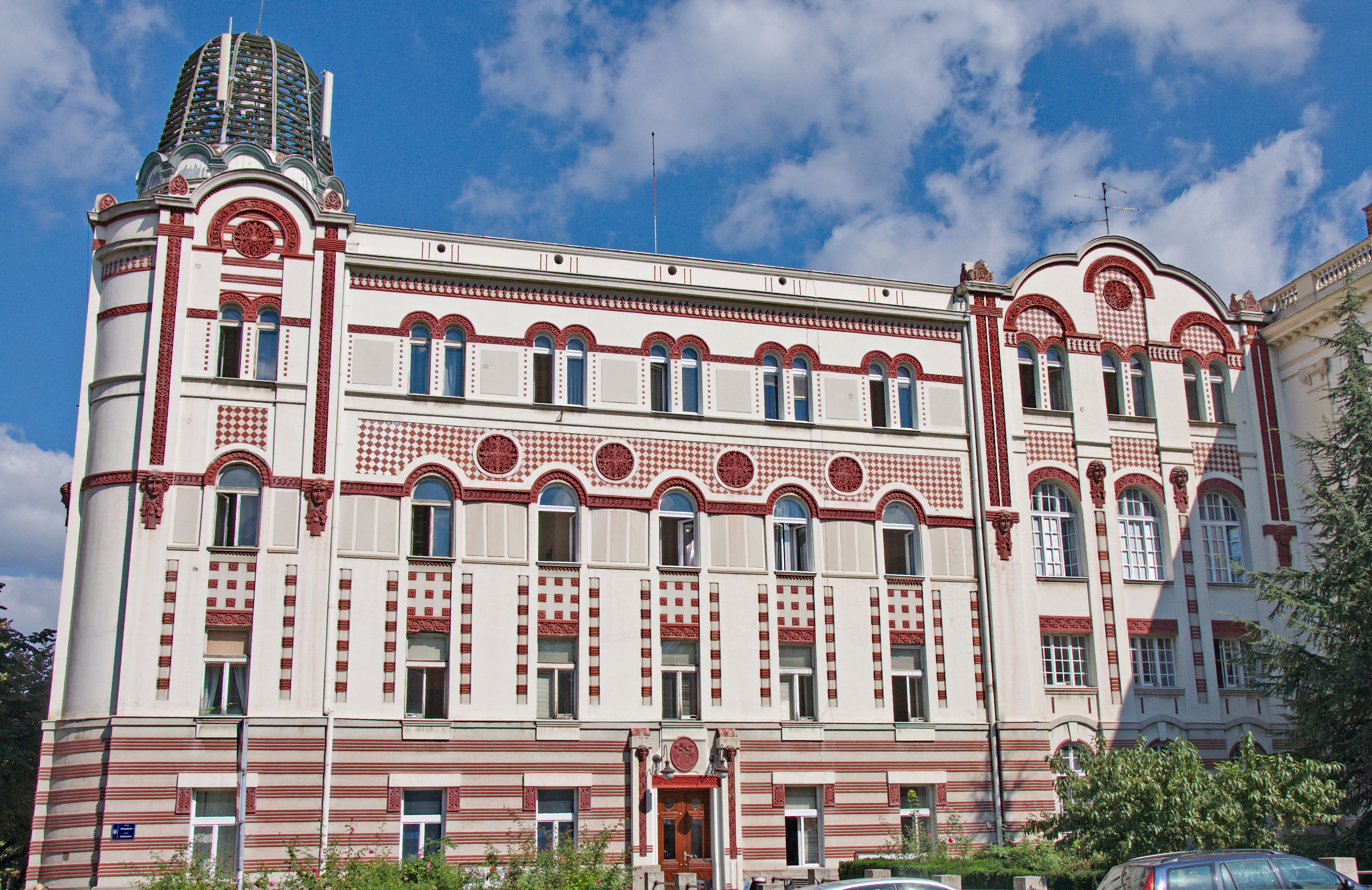
- Interactive map of the Old Telephone Exchange, Belgrade area

General information
- Classification: Cultural heritage of great importance
- Location: Stari Grad, Belgrade, Serbia
- Construction started: 1908

The Old Telephone Exchange (Serbian: Зграда старе телефонске централе у Београду, romanized: Zgrada stare telefonske centrale u Beogradu) is a building located in Belgrade, Serbia, at 47 Kosovska Street. It was built according to the project by Branko Tanazević for the telephone exchange and is the first such building in Serbia. It was completed in 1908. The third floor was added later, after the First World War. The building is under state protection since 1981 as a cultural property of great importance. Conservation works were performed in 1988.

== Appearance ==
Regarding the spatial and structural aspect, it relies on the traditions of the academy, while the formation was derived in Serbian-Byzantine style. With functional bases, basically simple architectural compositions, the emphasis is placed on the processing of the angular part of the building with a characteristic dome. The facade is asymmetrical, with a shallow avant-corps of greater width at one end of the building and large window openings that occupy much of the facade canvas. Richly applied shallow plastic decoration, reduced almost to the plane of the facade, is made of stylized motifs taken from the heritage of the Moravian school (rosettes, ornaments, geometric designs, chess boxes). Besides being a successful realization of the Serbian-Byzantine style in Belgrade architecture and significant work of art of one of the main proponents of this style, this building also has historical significance as a representative building of a specific purpose, documenting the development of telephone services in Serbia in the early 20th century.

The building was featured on a banknote of 50 million dinars in 1993. Conservation works were carried out in 1988.

== See more ==
- List of cultural monuments in Belgrade
- Cultural monuments of exceptional importance
