= Momir Korunović =

Serbian architect (1883–1969)

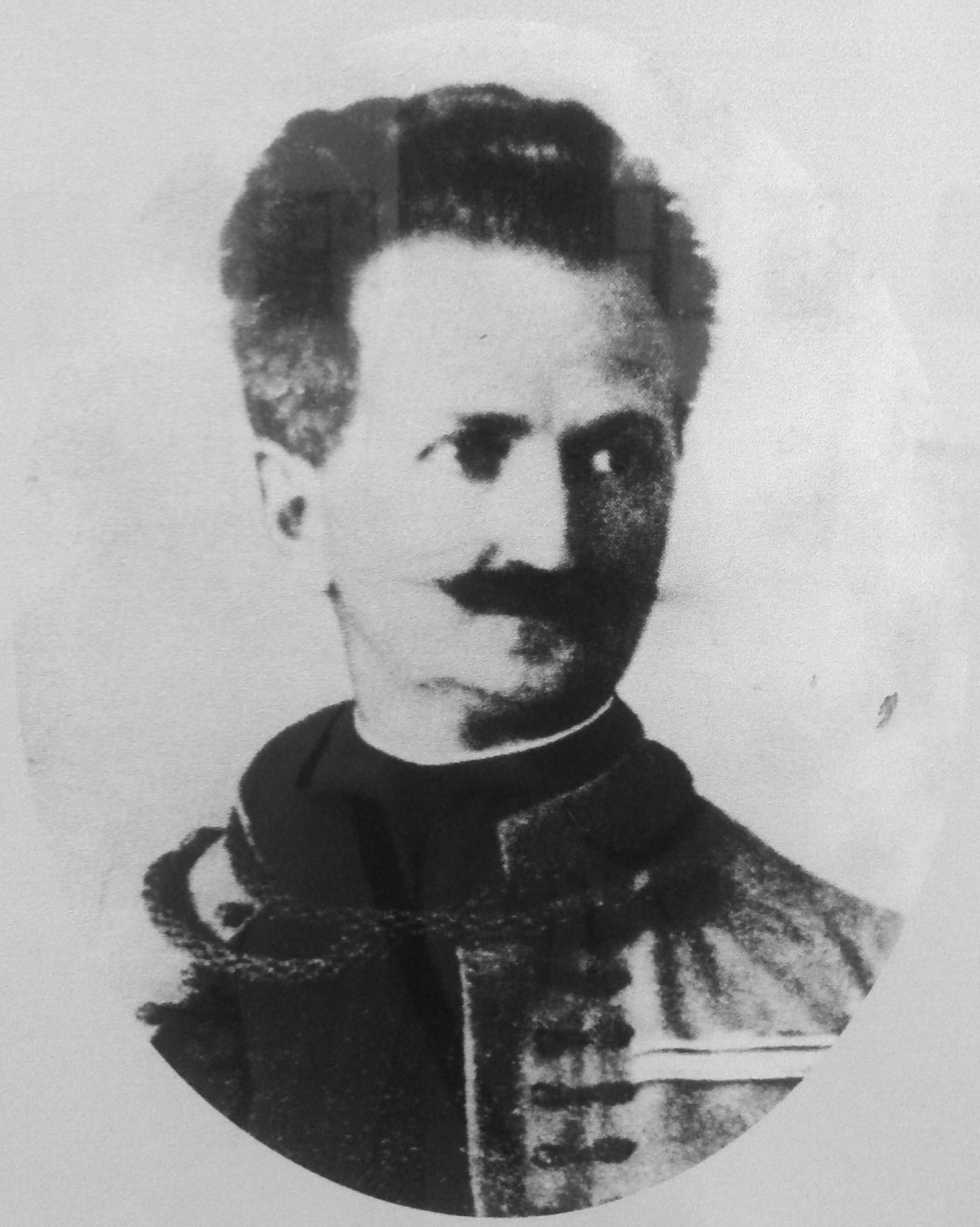
- Born: April 17, 1883; Jagodina, Kingdom of Serbia
- Died: April 17, 1969 (aged 86); Belgrade, SFR Yugoslavia
- Education: Czech Technical University in Prague
- Occupation: Architect

Momir Korunović (Serbian Cyrillic: Момир Коруновић), was a Serbian architect associated with the Serbo-Byzantine Revival style, and was sometimes called the 'Serbian Gaudi'. Although he designed many buildings in Belgrade and the rest of Yugoslavia between the two World Wars, many of his works were substantially altered or destroyed during World War II and the communist period, resulting in him being largely forgotten today.

== Biography ==
=== Early life and education ===
Momir Korunović was born on April 17, 1883, in Jagodina, Serbia. He was raised in the village of Glogovac, where his father Prota Petar Korunović served as a priest.

Korunović finished his higher education in Belgrade and undertook postgraduate studies at Czech Technical University in Prague, funded by a scholarship from the Ministry of Education of Serbia. During his studies he created a distinctive style that he continued to develop throughout his career.

=== Military service ===
Korunović served in the 1912-1913 First Balkan War and received the Gold Medal for bravery for his courage and professional merits. His experience during this war later influenced Korunović to take an authentic Serbian point of view in architecture. He also served in the military during the First World War, continuing to make sketches and designs for subsequent projects during his service, and participating in the Royal Serbian Army's retreat through Albania.

=== Architecture ===
In addition to working in the Ministry of Construction as a civil servant, Korunović was also a prominent member of the Pan-Slavic organization Sokol, becoming head of the Belgrade Sokol Society "Matica" and responsible for the construction of about 30 Sokol movement buildings in Serbia. In 1926 he was the youngest member of the commission for the construction of the Church of Saint Sava, and he participated in the "Salon of Architecture" exhibition in 1929. Among the many modernist architects of that era, he was a representative of traditional architecture and romanticism.

During the occupation of the Kingdom of Yugoslavia by the Axis powers during World War 2 he continued to work in the Ministry of Construction until his retirement in 1942. After the war he spent his retirement days in his house in Vračar, where he wrote his memoirs and illustrated earlier publications. He died on April 17, 1969, in Belgrade, and was buried in the village of Bogava.

== Projects ==
Korunović build the Belgrade city center for physical culture "Stari DIF", located on Deligradska street in Savski Venac municipality, to meet the needs of the Sokol Society "Matica" between 1929 and 1936. He also designed "Sokol Stadium" for the 1930 Sokol "manifestation" in Belgrade, which was located on the site of today's Faculty of Mechanical Engineering.

In 1934 Korunović constructed Sokol Building in Jajce, where the second conference of AVNOJ was held, and where later the Museum of the National Struggle for Liberation was established. This stadium accommodated around 40,000 spectators and had four arched entrances for the audience and three for the athletes. On the north side there was a music pavilion in the form of an arched tribune with towers in the background, decorated with the symbols of the Sokol movement, while on the south side was the royal lodge. He was awarded the Order of Saint Sava for this project.

Korunović designed the Seismological Institute Building and the Post-Telegraph-Telephone Museum as well as many other churches, monuments, and prominent buildings including, for example, the Memorial Ossuary, Mačkov kamen and Zebrnja, resulting in a total of 143 authored projects to his name.

In 1922 Korunović was entrusted with the task of renovating the marshal's office of the Yugoslavian Royal Palace so it would be suitable for guests coming to Belgrade for the royal wedding of King Alexander I Karađorđević and Princess Maria of Romania. The semicircular wings were kept as accommodation while the rest of the building was assigned to the Marshal of the Court. The building was demolished in 1953 as it blocked the view of the Parliament. The old Post Office was also altered beyond recognition, as the then-new communist authorities considered its façade "too bourgeois". They removed the remains of the façade and reconstructed the building on the skeletal architecture under it in the more simplified style being pushed by the government in the immediate post-war period.

== Selected works ==
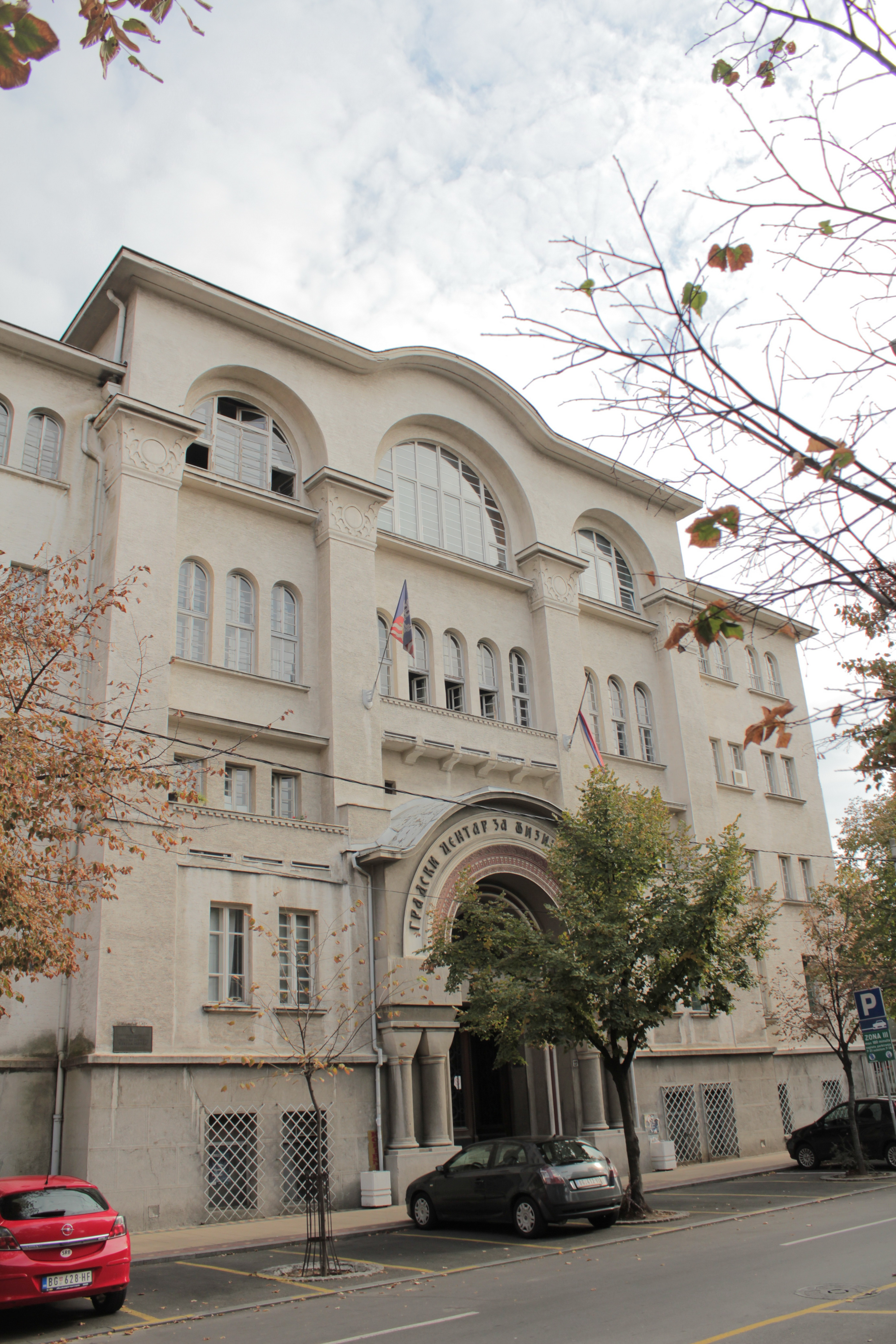
Sokol building in Belgrade

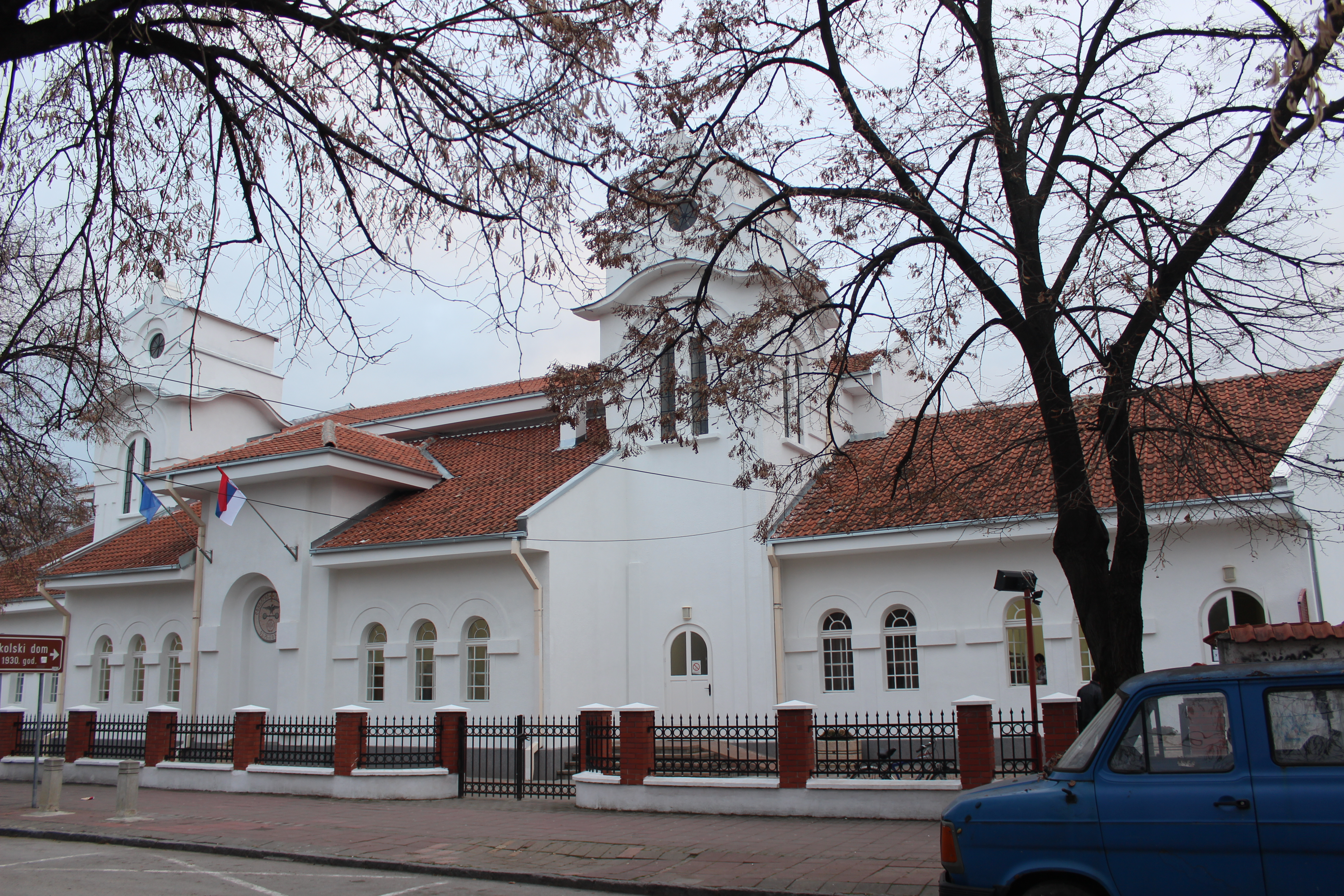
Sokol building in Obrenovac

Sts. Cyril and Methodius Church (Ljubljana)

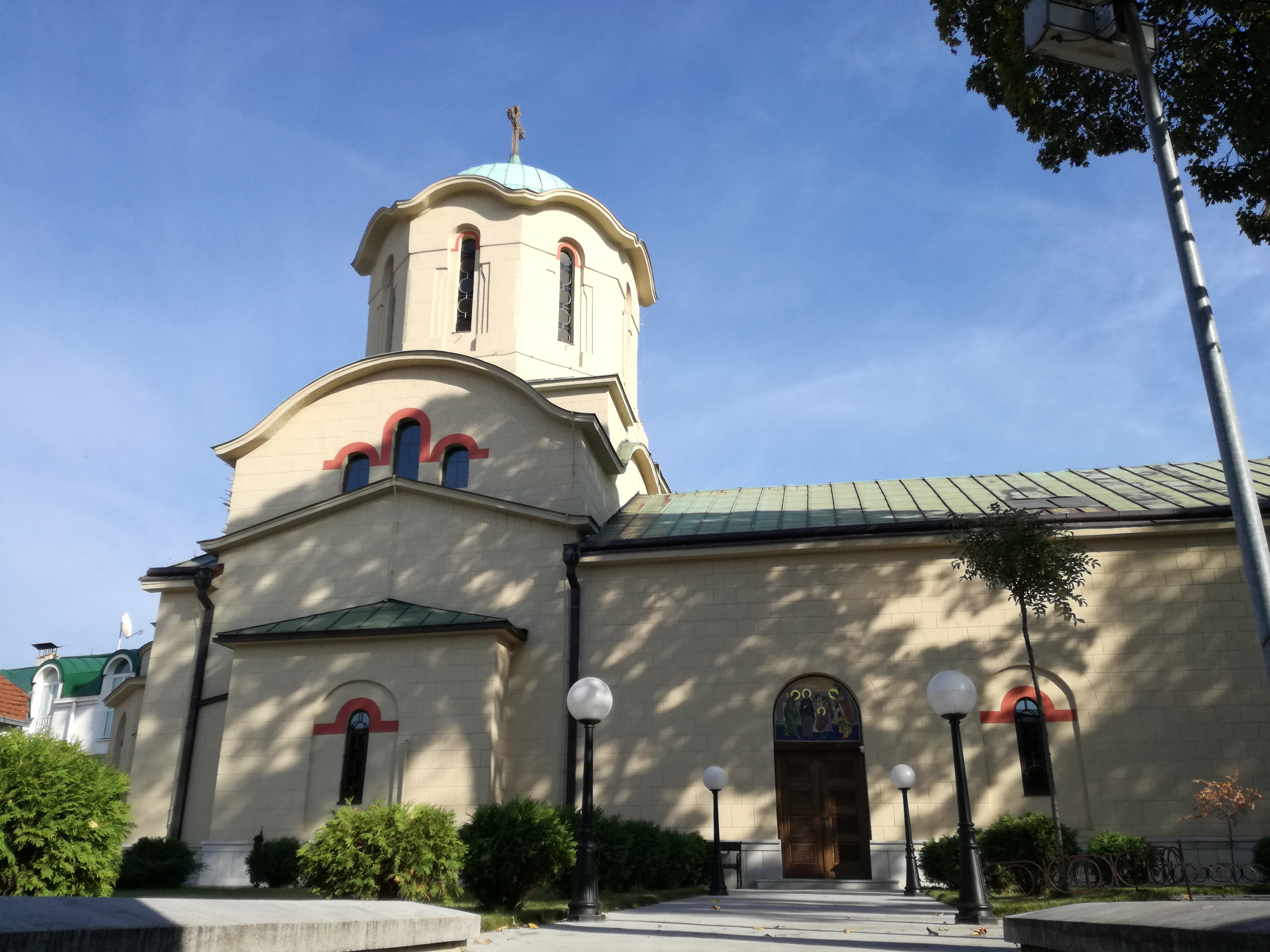
Church of the Cover of the Blessed Virgin Mary in Belgrade

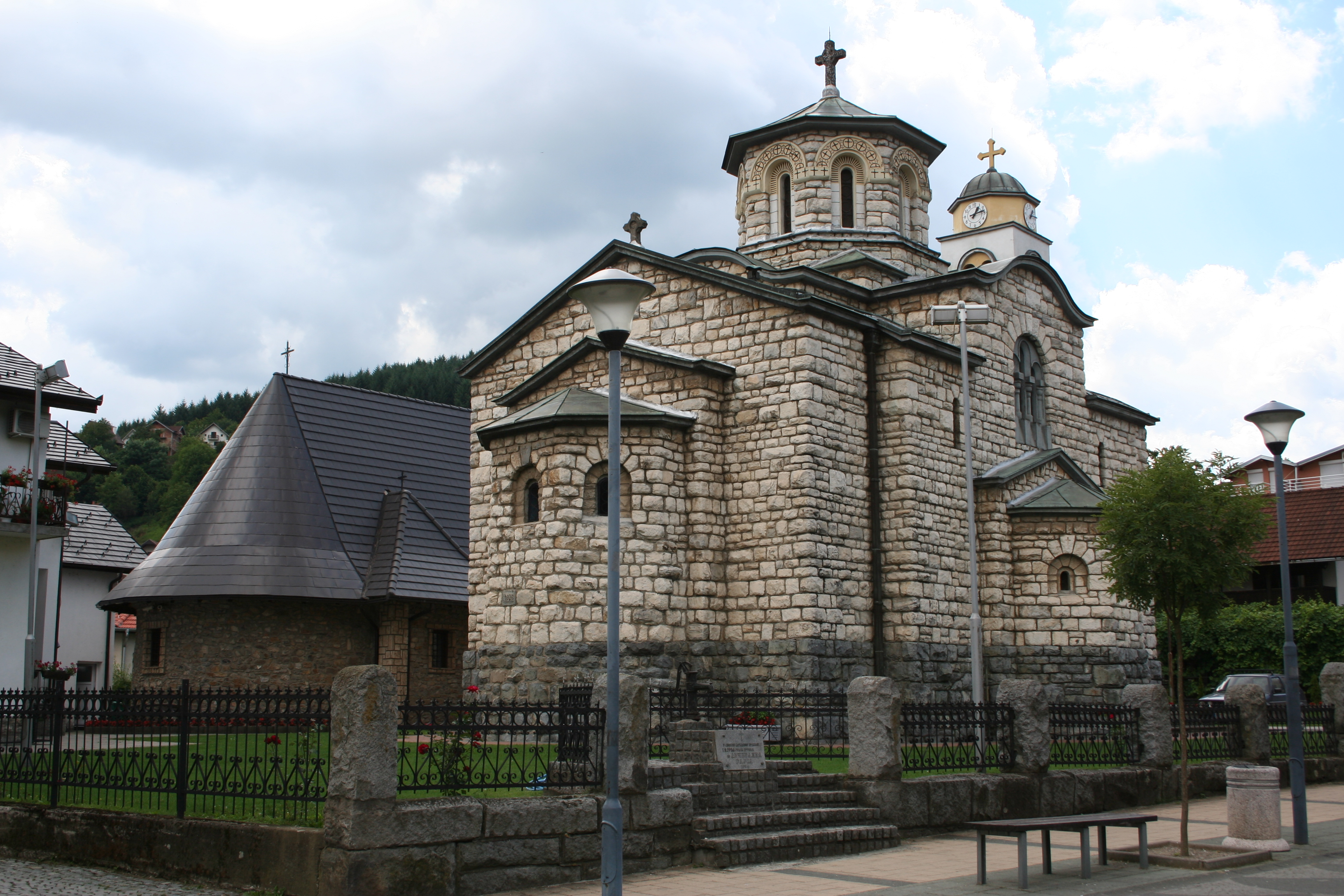
Church of Holy Ascension, Krupanj

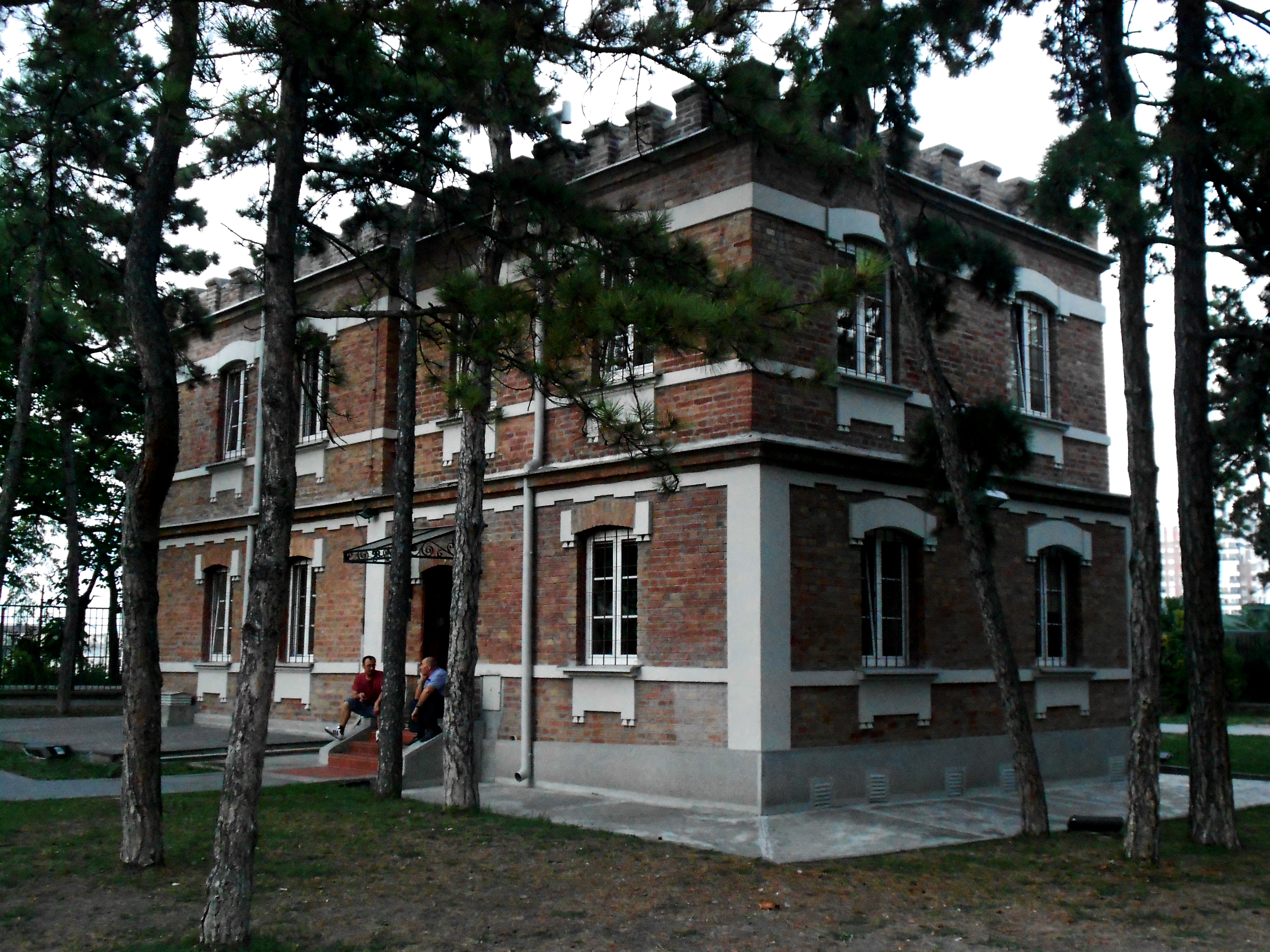
Seismological Institute Building

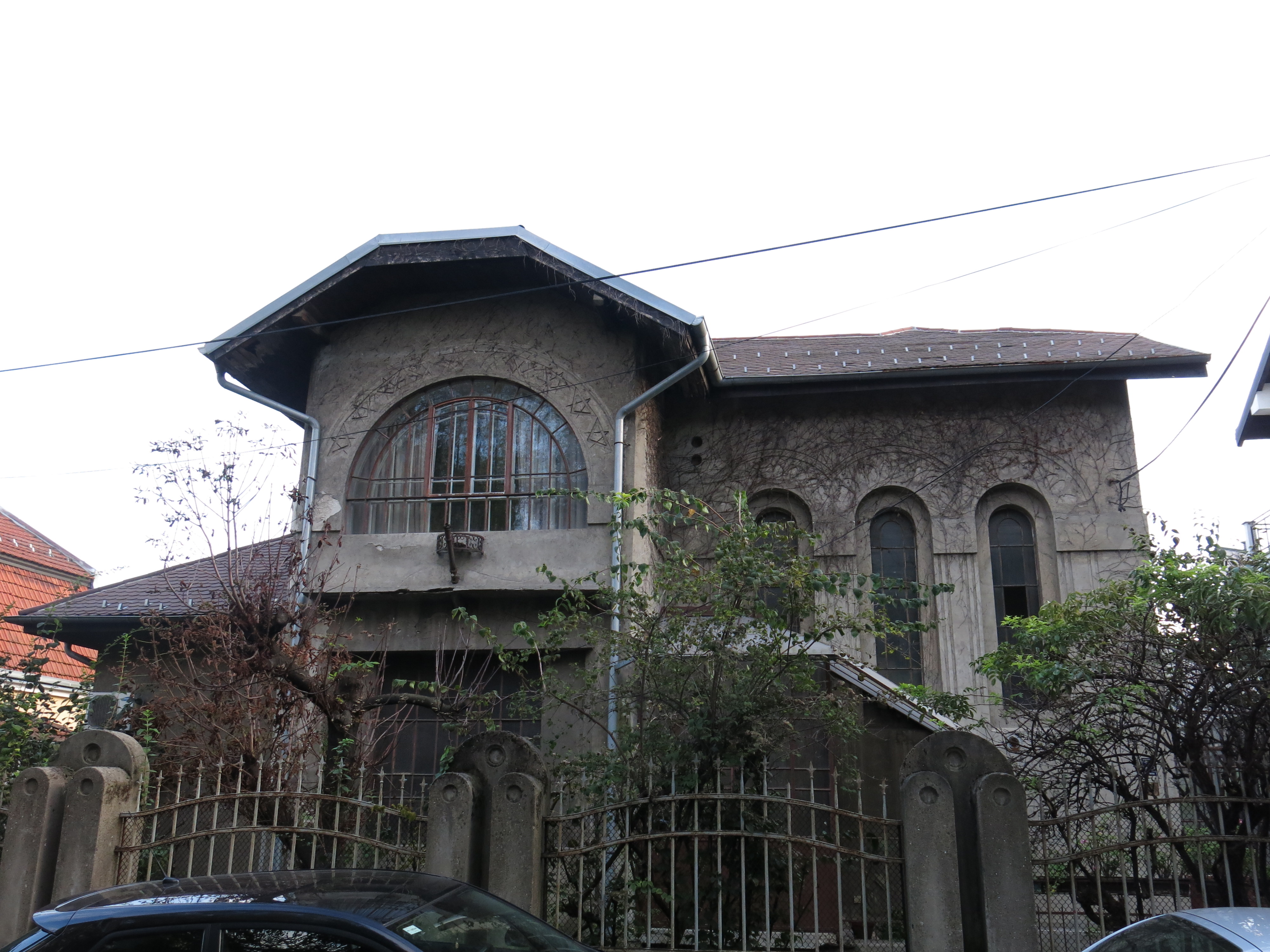
Korunović's family house

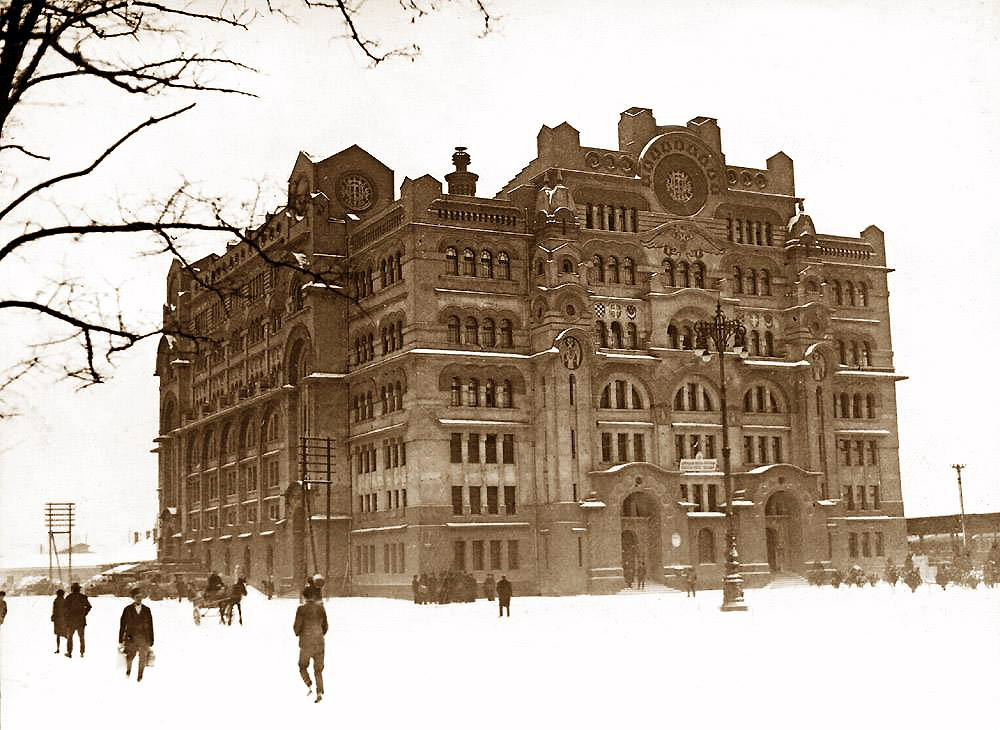
Old Post Office

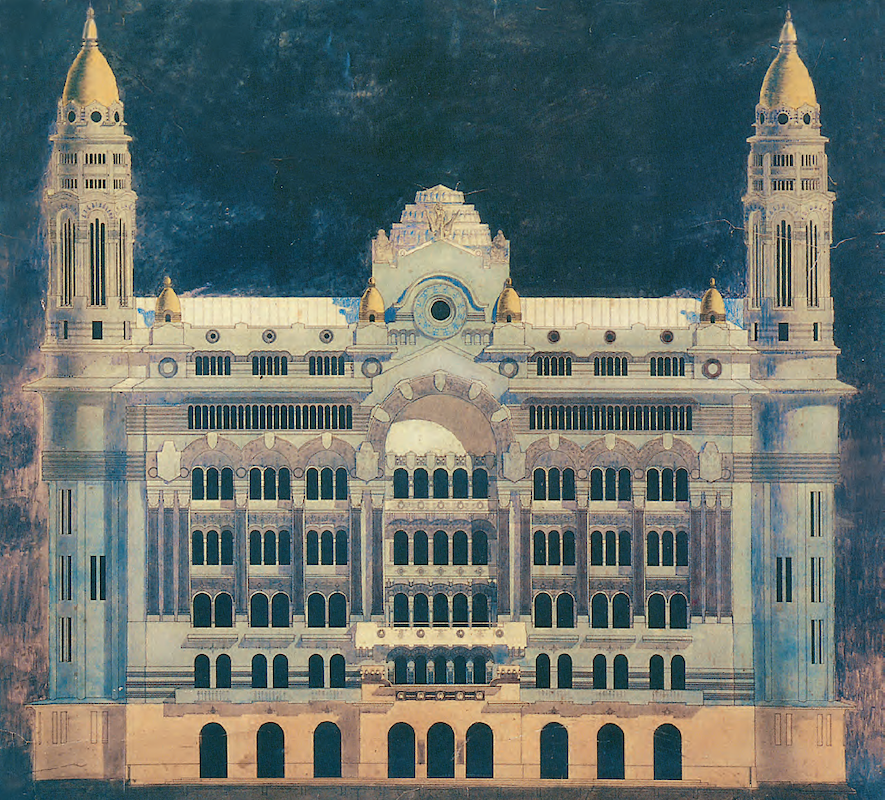
Unrealized project, 1912–1914

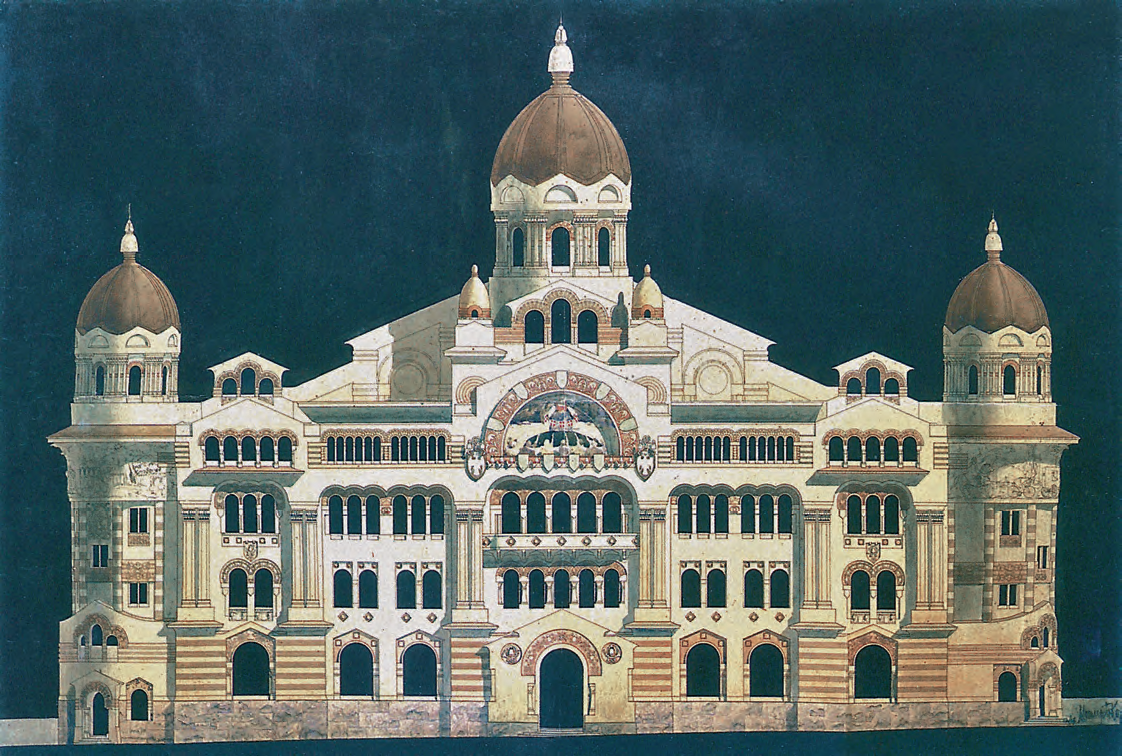
Unrealized project of a Post office building, 1912-1914

== See also ==
- List of Serbian architects
- Milan Antonović
- Dragutin Dragiša Milutinović

== Literature ==
- Đurić Zamolo, Divna, Graditelji Beograda, 1815–1914
- Kadijević, Aleksandar, Momir Korunović, 1996
- Kadijević, Aleksandar (2013). Архитекта Момир Коруновић И Ратна 1912. Година [Architect Momir Korunović and War 1912] (PDF). Arhitektura I Urbanizam (in Serbian) (37): 43–49. doi:10.5937/a-u37-3983.
- Ћирковић, Симо (2009). Ко је ко у Недићевој Србији 1941—1944 [Who's who in Nedić's Serbia 1941-1944] (in Serbian). Beograd: Просвета. ISBN 978-86-7274-388-3.
- Благојевић, Марија (2003). Визуална култура Сокола [Visual culture of Sokol] (PDF) (Thesis) (in Serbian). University of Beograd.
- Митровић, Владимир (2016). Из историје културе и архитектуре: записи једног истраживача [On the history of culture and architecture: notes of a researcher] (in Serbian). Novi Sad: Museum of Contemporary Art of Vojvodina.
