= Zebrnjak =

- Зебрњак
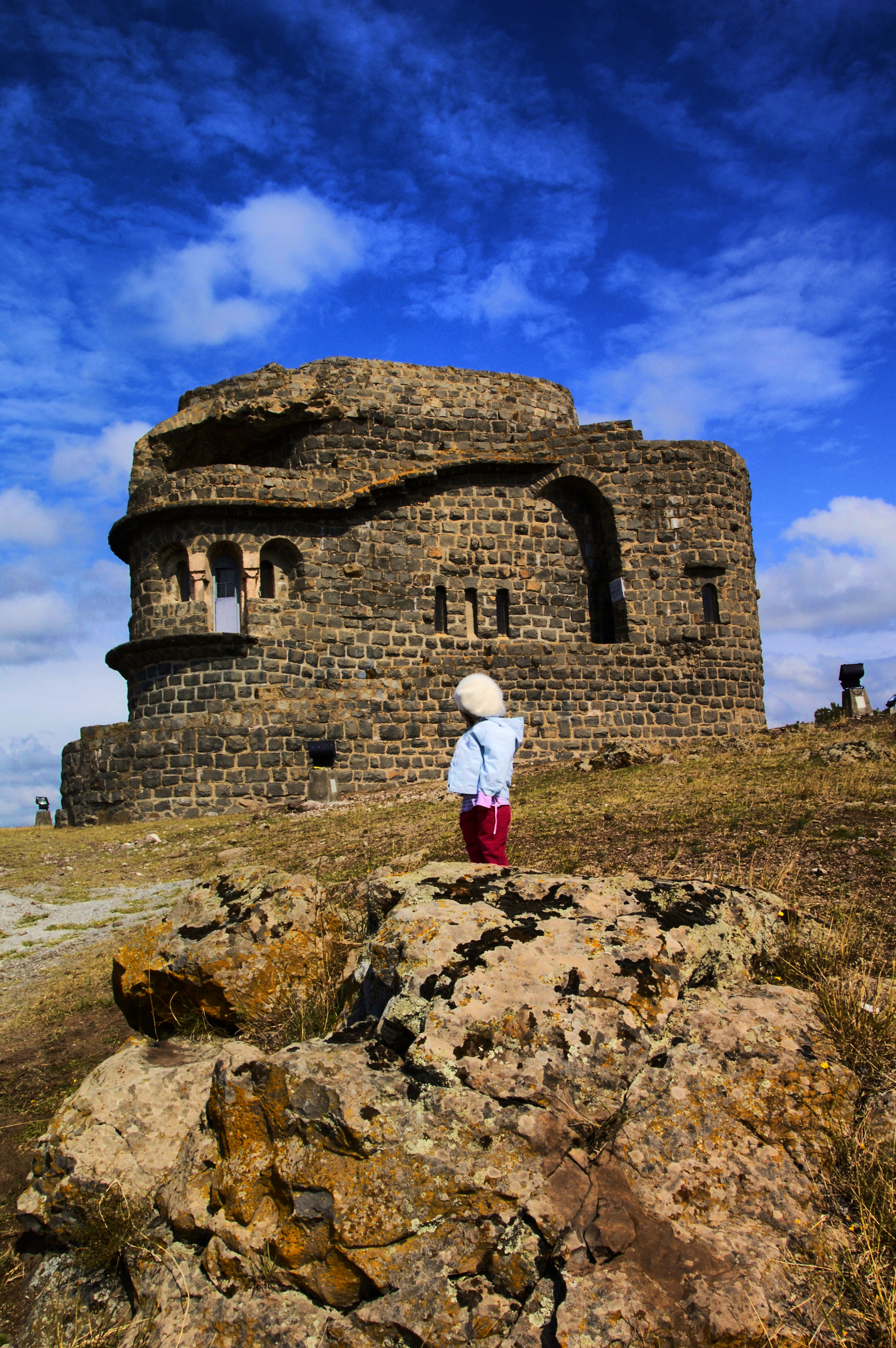
- Zebrnjak mausoleum remains
- Interactive map of Zebrnjak
- Location: Mlado Nagoričane, Kumanovo, North Macedonia
- Coordinates: 42.1491°N 21.7853°E
- Designer: Momir Korunović
- Type: Victory column Mausoleum
- Material: Stone
- Height: 48.5 meters (159 ft) (now 18.5 metres (61 ft))
- Completion date: 1937
- Dedicated to: 723 Serbian soldiers who died in Battle of Kumanovo

The Zebrnjak Memorial (Serbian: Спомен-костурница на брду Зебрњаку) is a war memorial commemorating the Battle of Kumanovo, fought in 1912 as part of the First Balkan War . It is situated on the battlefield, close to the village of Mlado Nagoričane, near Kumanovo, North Macedonia.

== History ==
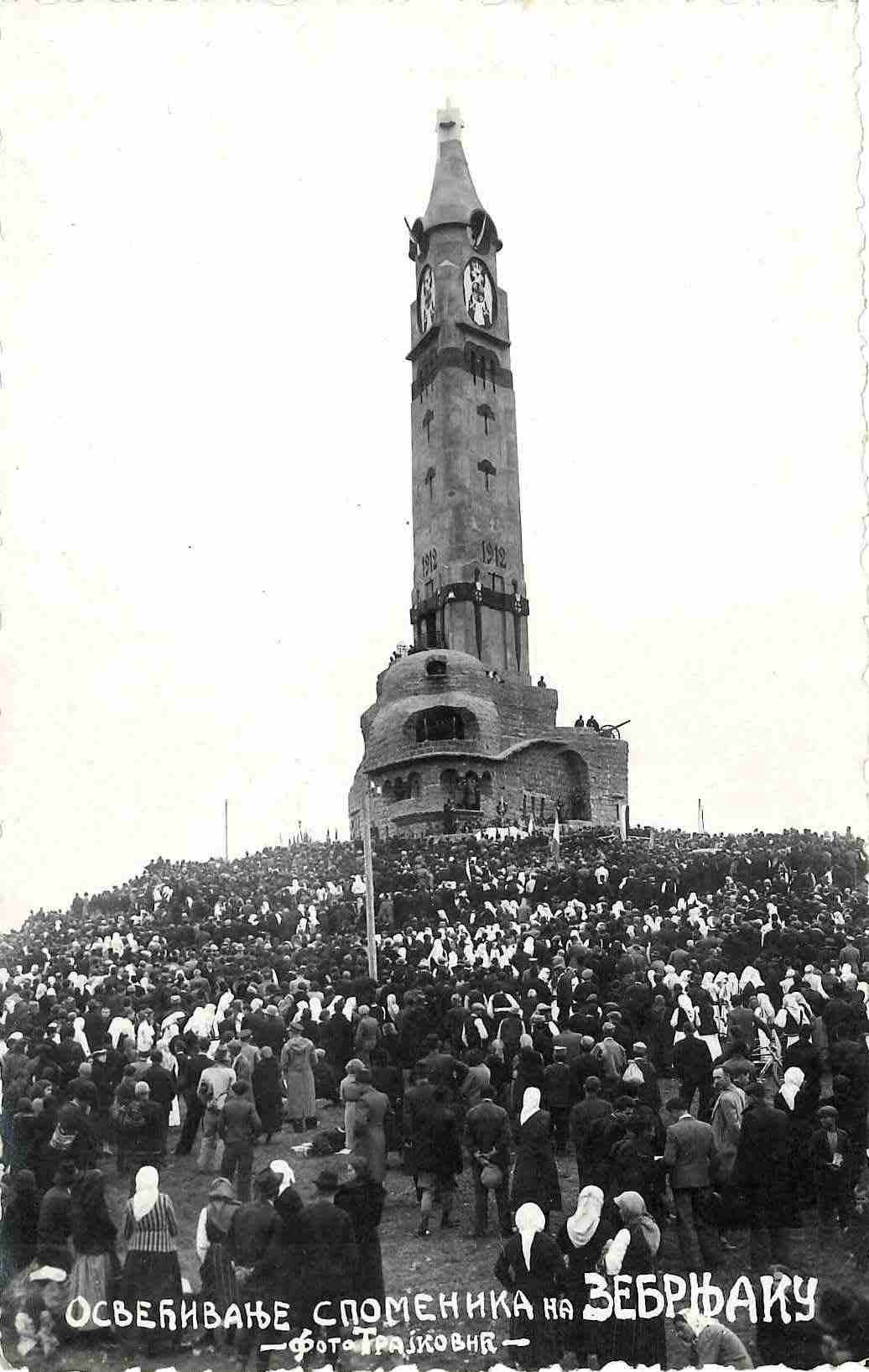
Unveiling ceremony of the memorial on Zebrnjak hill in 1937.

It was built in 1937, for the 25th anniversary of the Battle of Kumanovo which took place on 23 and 24 October 1912 during the First Balkan War, between the Ottoman Vardar Army and the First Serbian Army. In the battle the Ottoman army was defeated and was forced to withdraw.

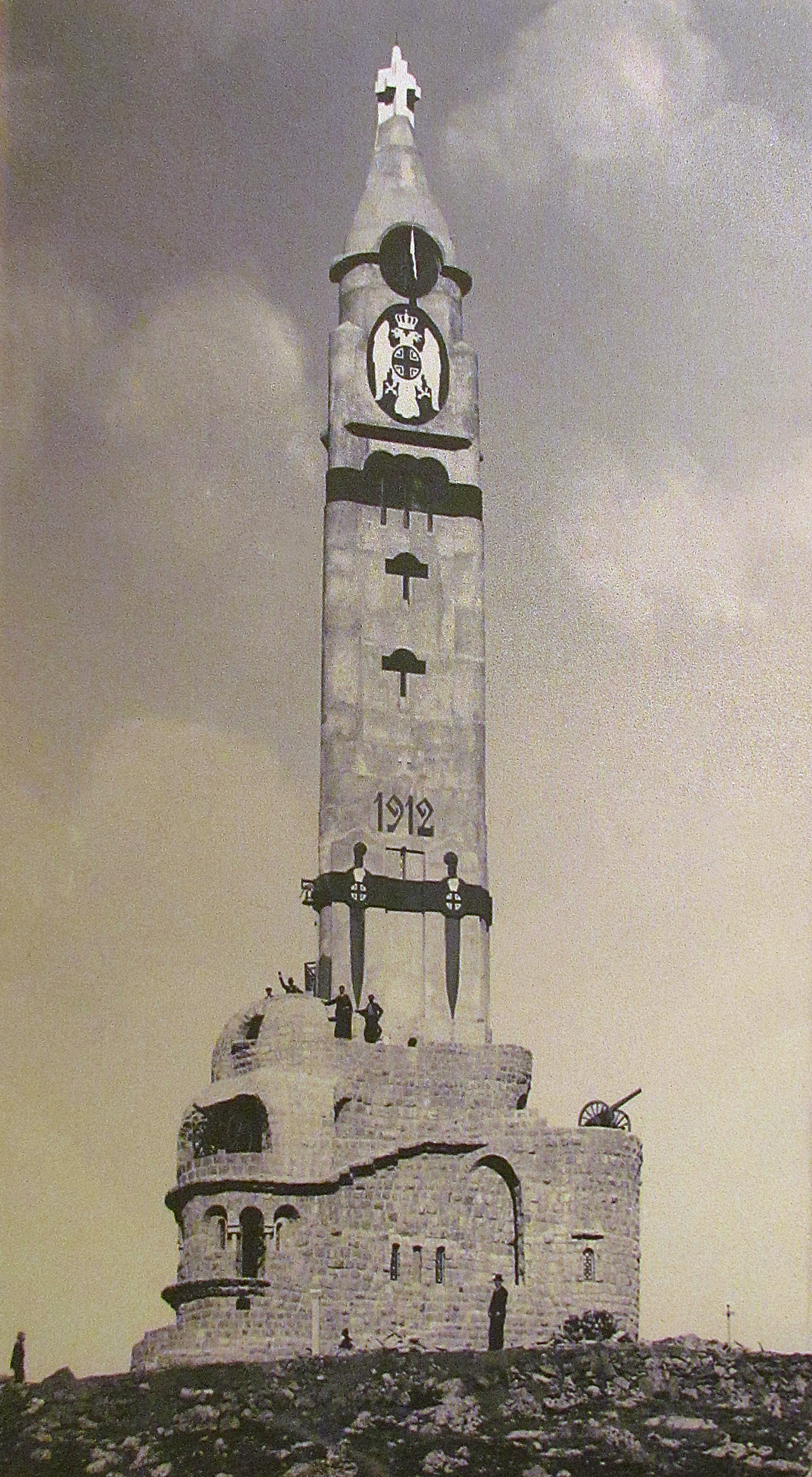
Monument pre-WW2.

The memorial complex was built in the period from 1934 to 1937 on the site of the battle according to the project of architect Momir Korunović. The memorial was ceremoniously opened on the 25th anniversary, October 31, 1937, with great interest from the public and the press.

The monument was built of hardest basalt and reinforced concrete. It was shaped as 48.5-metre (159 ft) high obelisk-tower. It was by far one of the highest monuments not only on the territory of Yugoslavia, but the entire Balkan Peninsula. It consists of two parts, a pedestal and a tower. The pedestal presents a mausoleum or memorial ossuary in which the remains of Serbian soldiers killed in battle are housed. The frescoes in the interior of mausoleum were painted by Živorad Nastasijević, on them were represented pictures from everyday life with figures wearing Serbian folklore clothing. Most of the Serbian soldiers were of peasant origin. The tower is a triangular obelisk topped by a night light.

Of harmonious proportions, with a slender tower, this memorial could be seen from a great distance, even at night, because the light of three petromax lamps erupted from its dome. It was a symbolic, eternal lamp of the dead whose bones rested there.

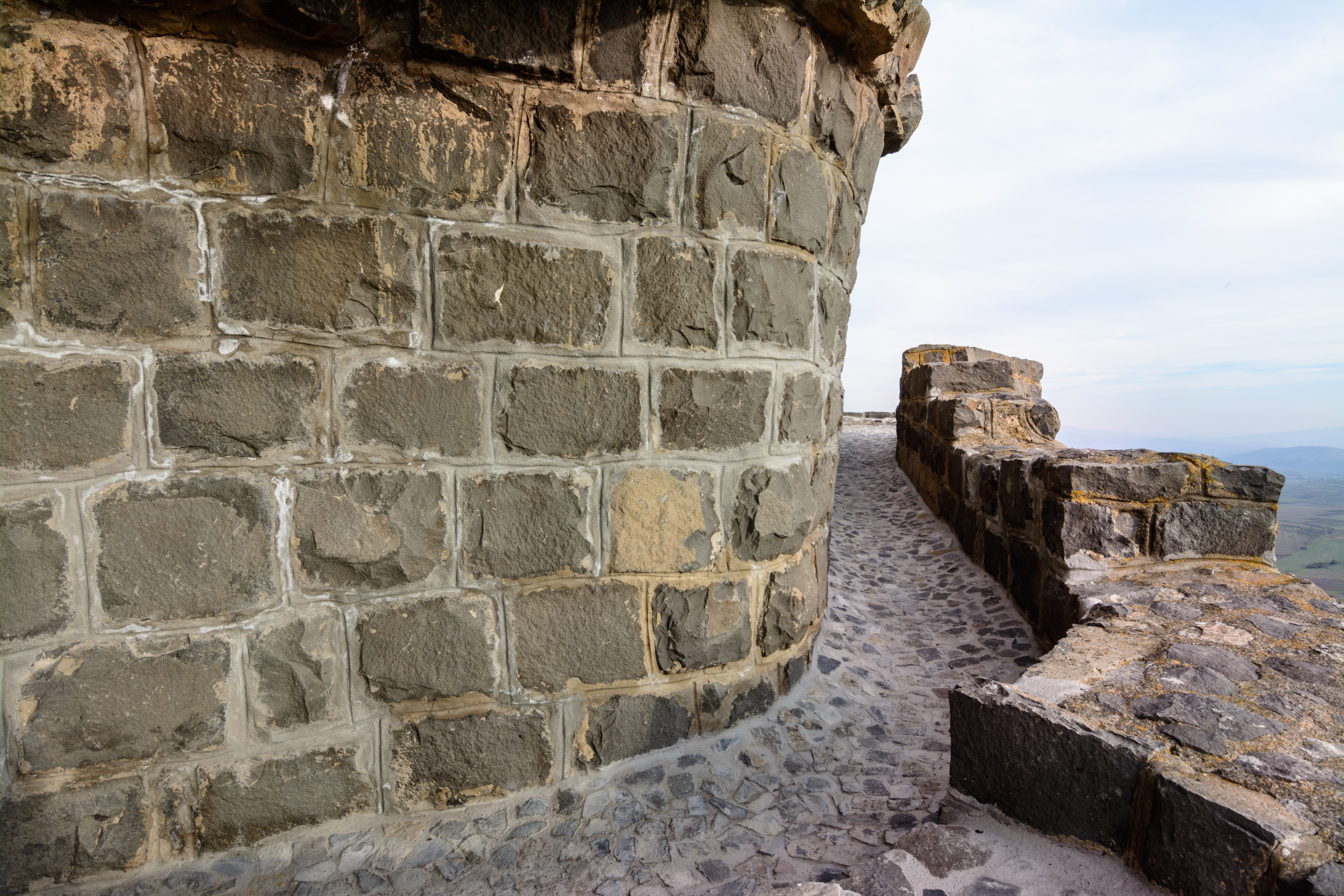
An open spiral path.

On the ground floor of the monument were rooms that served as the ossuaries of the fallen soldiers. Above them was a space, divided into nine chambers, which housed a museological exhibition. Above the foot of the monument, eighteen meters from the ground, was a memorial chapel which could be reached by an open spiral ramp. At each corner of the spiral path widened by circular plateaus stood the original cannons used in the battle. An iron staircase led to the space above the chapel, where wooden oak ladders were placed, connecting the five floors of the high tower with concrete galleries. At the very top of the tower, under the roof structure itself, there were the mentioned lamps that illuminated the surroundings at night.

The sculpture is a synthesis of romantic-expressionist artistic pursuits. Expressionist elements are reflected in the triangular base, developed pedestal and free modeling of the high tower of strong silhouette symbolic action. They are complemented by the recognizable semiotics of heraldic decorative plastic and night lighting of petromax lamps placed in the niche of the egg-shaped end of the obelisk. According to the sculptural silhouette and organic composition, this monument is in the expressionist sense partly inspired by the concept of Einstein's Tower in Potsdam (1920) by Erich Mendelsohn.

== Destruction ==
After the German and Italian invasions in April 1941, Yugoslavia was divided between the Axis powers. The Bulgarian occupation authorities mined and destroyed the monument in a large explosion on May 24, 1942. Complete monument reconstruction was announced to be completed in centennial of the Battle of Kumanovo, in 2012.

== See also ==
- Memorial Ossuary, Čačak
- Memorial Ossuary, Cer
