= Mihailo Valtrović =

Serbian historian, art critic and architect (1839–1915)

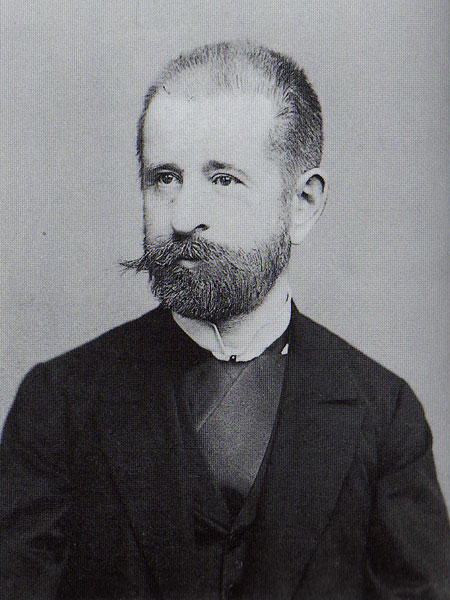
- Mihailo Valtrović circa 1885
- Born: 17 September 1839; Belgrade, Principality of Serbia
- Died: 9 September 1915 (aged 75); Belgrade, Kingdom of Serbia
- Occupations: architect, archeologist, author

Mihailo Valtrović (7 September 1839 – 9 September 1915) was a Serbian architect, professor of archeology, one of the first pioneers of art history in Serbia, and key representative of the Historismus along with architect Dragutin Dragiša Milutinović. Valtrović was the first professor of archeology in Serbia, the initiator and founder of Serbian Archeology and founder and first president of the Serbian Archaeological Society, as well as a long-time member of the Serbian Academy of Sciences and Arts. He designed a number of state insignias, including the royal crown and sceptre for King Peter I.

== Biography ==
Born in Belgrade, Mihailo Valtrović graduated from the natural science section of Lyceum of the Principality of Serbia in his hometown. After a brief service in the General Administration, he received a government scholarship to pursue his post-graduate studies abroad at Karlsruhe, where he chooses to study ancient architecture. After having completed his studies and training in architecture at the University of Karlsruhe (TH), Valtrović first applied his profession in the construction industry and then became a professor of science and technical subjects at Belgrade's Velika škola in 1875. In 1881, Valtrović was awarded the chair of the newly-established Department of Archeology for his profound knowledge of antique architecture and taking part in the early 1882 archeological expeditions at Viminacium. He also proposed a Monuments Protection Act in 1889. From the beginning, he devoted a significant part of his teaching activity to the classical civilizations of Greece and Rome, emphasizing the importance of the arts in the history of mankind.

In 1896, Valtrović turned his efforts to the reorganization of the National Museum of Belgrade, where he held the post of the curator. Gradually, he left teaching altogether. His short but significant activity at the university was marked by an effort to introduce rigorous scientific methods in the study of antiquities. The stress, however, was placed upon the educational importance of classical antiquity and its aesthetic and ethical values for a modern established state and its cultural development, based on its historical character. Valtrović's program was influenced by his training, as well as the role models of German universities, where the study of classics was held to be the essential component of higher education. His protege, archeologist Miloje Vasić, would take his place at the Velika škola.

In 1901, Valtrović's former teaching post was established for the first trained archeologist, Miloje Vasić, who received his Ph.D. in 1898 from his mentor Adolf Furtwangler at the Ludwig-Maximilians-Universität München. For the next five decades, until Vasić's retirement in 1955, the study of archeology in Serbia was almost exclusively marked by his activity.

About 300 drawings and watercolors of Serbian medieval monuments, which Mihailo Valtrović and Dragutin Dragiša Milutinović (son of Sima Milutinović Sarajlija) made as a result of fieldwork research on Serbian medieval monasteries, undertaken in 1871-1884 within a project supported by the Serbian Learned Society were published in various newspapers. However, in 1884, a specialized periodical Starinar (Antiquarian) was established for publishing articles related to archaeological research. Interest in the Serbian medieval past was further increased after the first exhibition organized in 1888 by the Serbian Royal Academy which showed the results of research on Serbian churches and monasteries since 1846. Following the exhibition, the Academy submitted to the government the draft of the Act on Protection of Monuments, an updated version of the original 1844 Act on Protection of Ancient Monuments and in 1889 a new Act on State Archives, originally drafted in 1866.

Mihajlo Valtrović received a recognition for his life's work from the King himself.

== Selected works ==
- Građa za istoriju umetnosti Srbije, Belgrade, 1874
- Prodomos (in German), Vienna, 1878
- Pogled na staru srpsku crkvenu arhitekturu, Belgrade,1889
