= Dragutin Milutinović =

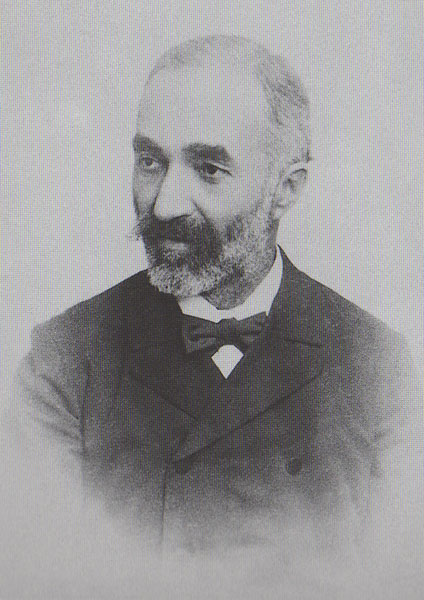
Dragutin Milutinović, architect (1840–1900)

Dragutin "Dragiša" S. Milutinović (Belgrade, Principality of Serbia, 29 November 1840 - Pančevo, Kingdom of Serbia, 16 December 1900), son of Sima Milutinović Sarajlija, was an engineer, an architect and art historian, a professor at the Velika škola, and a member of the Serbian Academy of Sciences and Arts. He collaborated on several research sites in Serbia with architect Mihailo Valtrović.

== Biography ==
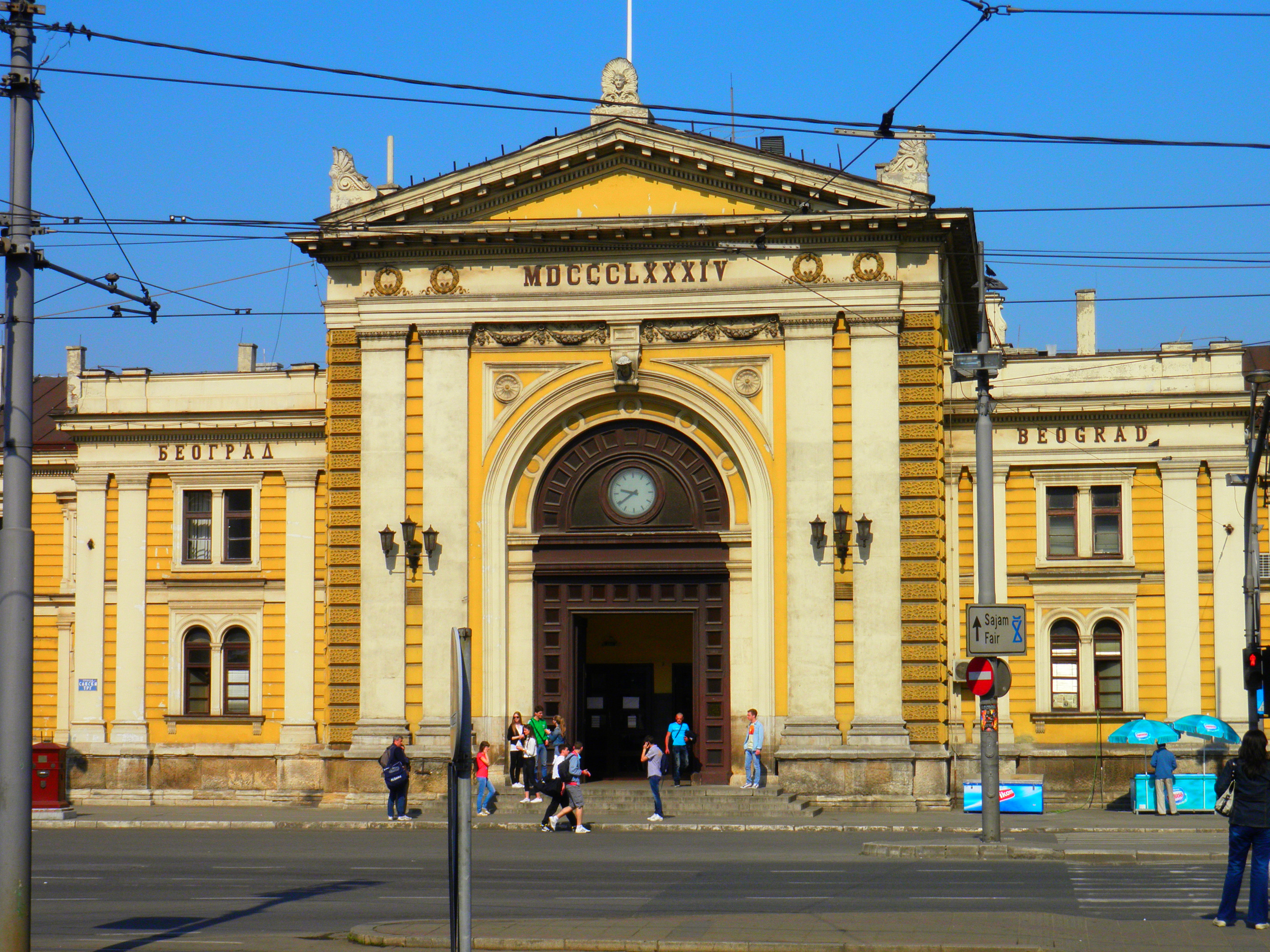
Belgrade Main railway station (1884)

He studied civil engineering in Berlin, Munich and the Karlsruhe Institute of Technology. He worked in Serbia at the Ministry of Construction. In collaboration with Mihailo Valtrović, he recorded and studied Serbian medieval monuments from 1871 to 1884.

His projects include several types of small churches, engineering work on cutting the new Belgrade-Aleksinac railroad for the Serbian Railways, as well as the Belgrade Main railway station (1884). He made the urban plan of the new town of Danilovgrad in Montenegro; he designed private buildings and iconostasis for the church of St. George in Novi Sad; in Dolovo near Pančevo, etc. He was elected a correspondent member of the Moscow Archaeological Society (1878) and an honorary member of the Serbian Royal Academy (1892).

== See also ==
- Nikola Nestorović
- Andra Stevanović
- Dimitrije T. Leko
- Petar Bajalović
- Đura Bajalović
- Krstić Brothers
