= Seismological Institute Building =

Historic building in Belgrade, Serbia

Seismological Institute Building in Belgrade
- Serbian: Зграда Сеизмолошког завода; Zgrada Seizmološkog zavoda
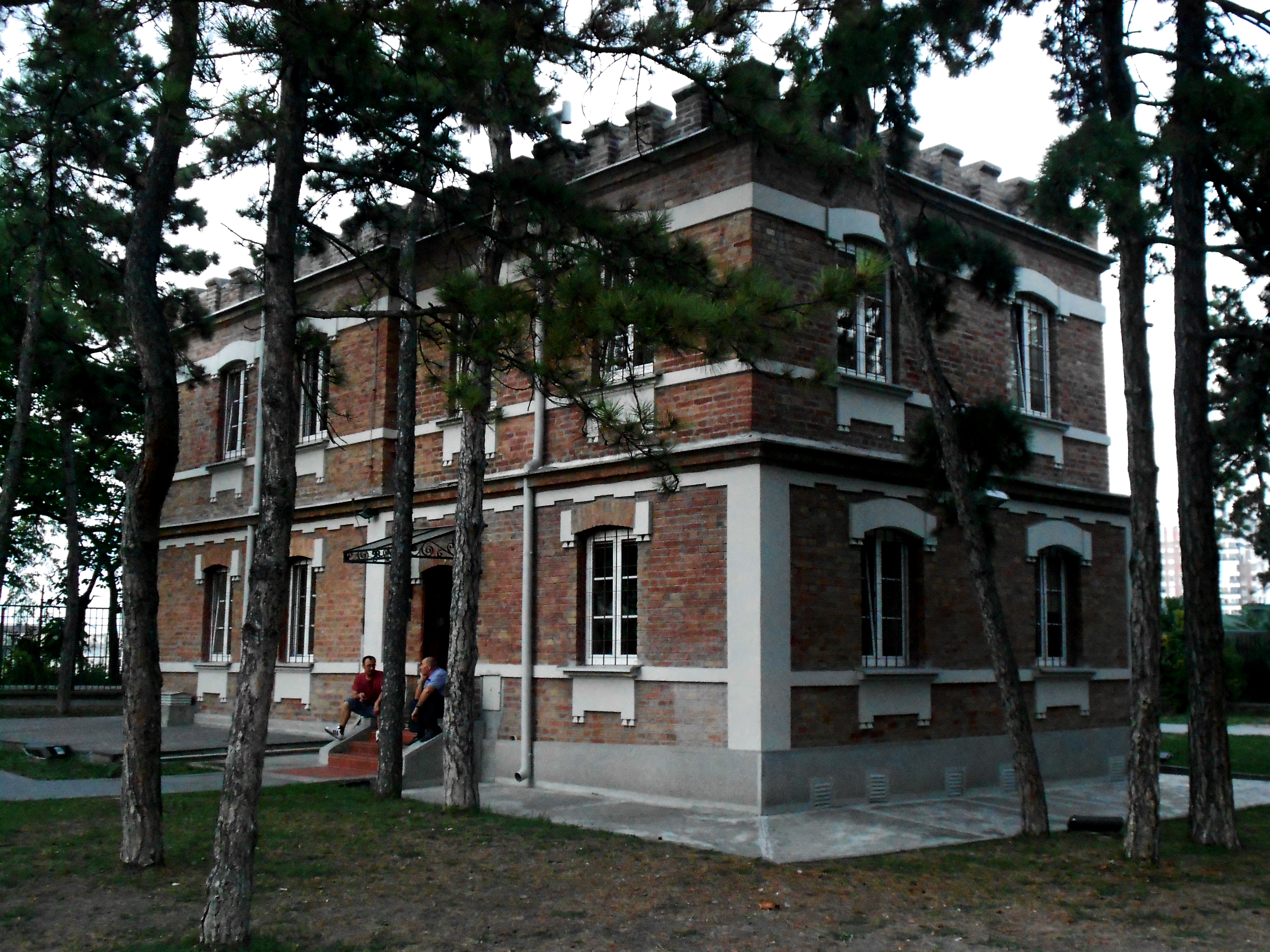
- Interactive map of Seismological Institute Building in Belgrade
- Location: Tašmajdan, Belgrade, Serbia
- Coordinates: 44°48′33″N 20°28′17″E
- Type: Cultural monument
- Beginning date: 1908
- Completion date: 1939

Seismological Institute Building (Serbian: Зграда Сеизмолошког завода, Zgrada Seizmološkog zavoda) is located in Tašmajdan, a park in Belgrade, Serbia. Built and adapted from 1908 to 1939, it was the first public building in this part of Belgrade and the first work of architect Momir Korunović, who later designed some of Belgrade's most important buildings during the interbellum, and was nicknamed "Serbian Gaudi". It was declared a cultural monument in 2007.

== History ==
After an earthquake hit the town of Svilajnac in 1893, the Geology institute of the Great School began collecting data on earthquakes. The event was declared by geologist Jovan Žujović to be one of Serbia's strongest. After the Great School transformed into the University of Belgrade in 1905, the university established a Seismology Institute in 1906 and proposed to locate it in Tašmajdan.

The commitment of the then assistant, and future professor, Jelenko Mihailović, Serbia's first and for many years only seismologist, is significant for the construction of the building.

=== Construction ===
Construction took place from 1908 to 1939, in four stages. The foundation stone was laid on 10 September 1908. The original building was constructed in 1909 by Korunović, using the Belgrade company of Stevan Hibner. The work was continued in 1912, based on a design by architect Đuro Bajalović. After another two periods of construction in 1926 and 1939, the building took its ultimate form.

== Design ==
Originally, the building had a single story, approximately square in plan, built entirely of brick, with a façade devoid of ornament. It was a pavilion-type construction, designed to serve a purpose rather than be decorative. Successive additions were more ornate, with arched lintels above the windows and regular prongs over the roof cornice.

The Seismological Institute is considered an object of significant cultural, historical and architectural value. As the first work of Serbian architect Momir Korunović, it is the oldest public building erected in Tašmajdan and one of the hallmarks of Tašmajdan Park today.

The first seismographs were installed in 1909, recording their first earthquake in June 1910. The entire inventory of the institution was destroyed during World War I. Instruments acquired in 1929 as war reparations were used until recent times.

The Seismology Institute was officially part of the University of Belgrade until 1995, and is still located in Tašmajdan.

== Literature ==
- А. Кадијевић, Момир Коруновић, Београд 1996.
- А. Кадијевић, Један век тражења националног стила у српкој архитектури (средина XIX – средина XX века), Београд, 1997.
- Н. Несторовић, Грађевине и архитекте у Београду прошлог столећа, Београд 1937.
- С. Г. Богуновић, Архитектонска енциклопедија Београда XIX и XX века, архитекти, том II, Београд 2005.
- З. Маневић, Лексикон српских архитеката XIX и XX века, Београд 1999.
