= Đura Bajalović =

Belgrade architect

Đura Bajalović also spelled Djura Bajalović (Šabac, Serbia, 13 February 1879 – Belgrade, Serbia, Yugoslavia, 5 May 1949) was one of the leading Belgrade architects of Art Nouveau in Serbian architecture at the turn of the 19th century. He was the younger brother of Petar Bajalović, also an architect and university professor.

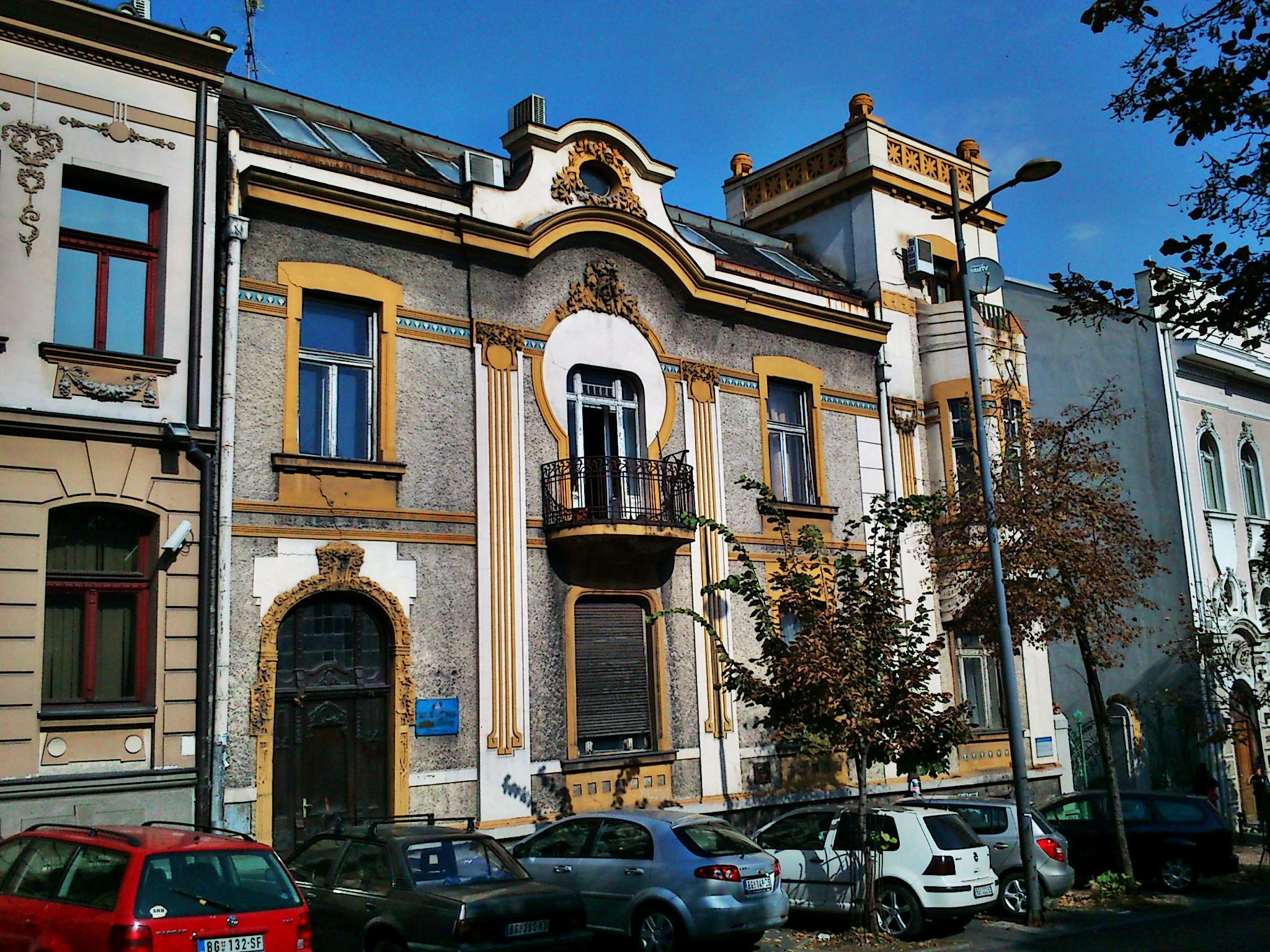
House of Leona Panajot

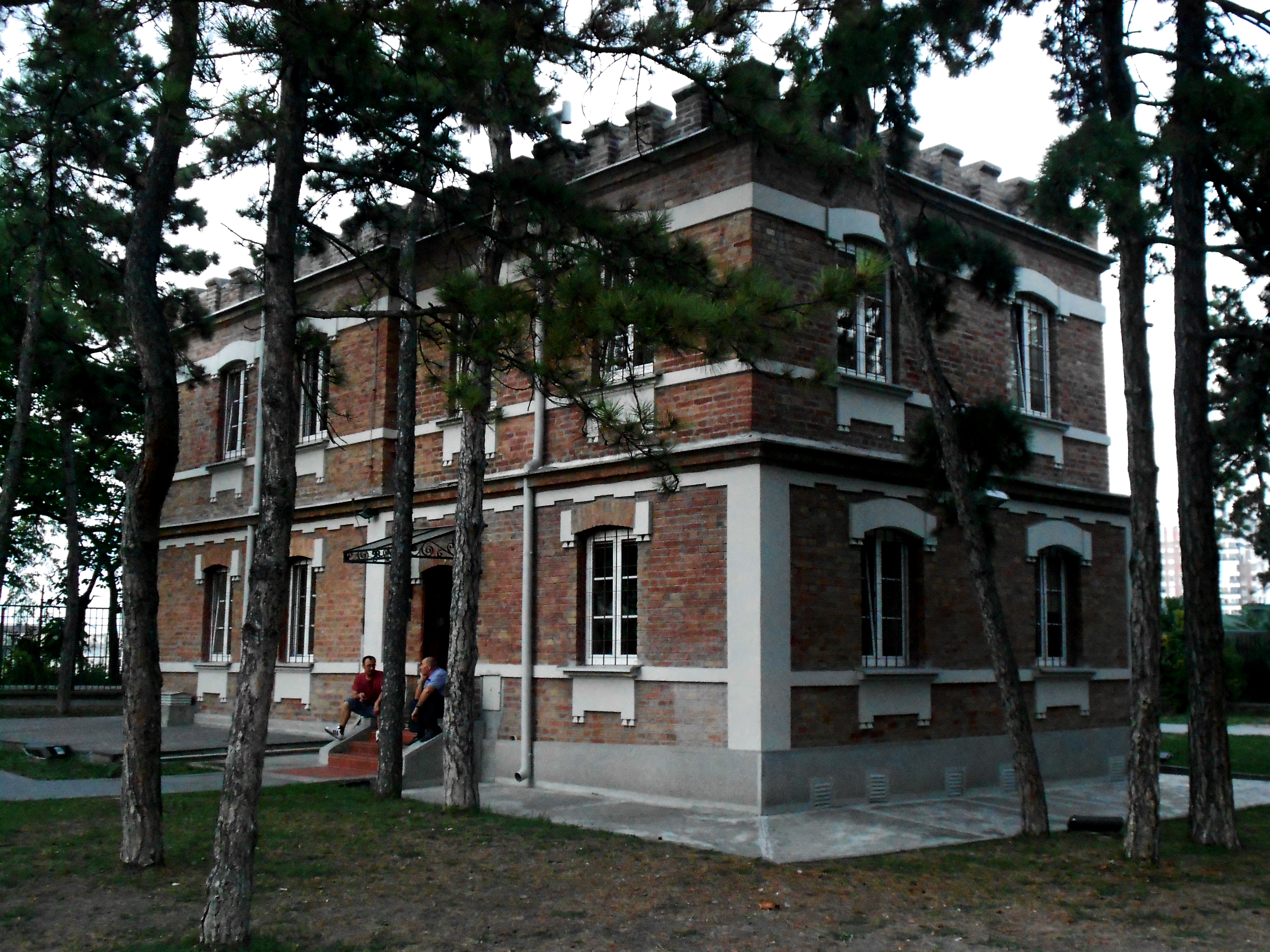
Seismological Institute Building

== Oeuvres ==
- House of Leona Panajot is at 31 Francuska Street in Belgrade, in the city municipality of Stari grad. The original house designed by Momir Korunović was constructed in 1909 by Belgrade firm Stevan Hibner, and represents as a cultural monument. In 1912 the same building was resumed and constructed as a multi-storey detached house by the architect Đura Bajalović, and further alterations, in 1926 and 1936, resulted in its present-day appearance. It consists of a basement, ground floor, first floor and attic. Architecturally, it is designed in the style of Art Nouveau. As a pronounced work of this style, the house was presented at the Fourth Serbian Art Exhibition in Belgrade in 1912. (His brother Petar Bajalović designed the Serbian Pavilion for the International Art Exhibition in Rome in 1911).
- Seismological Institute Building
- The House of Mihailo Tešić is one of the most beautiful ground floor houses commissioned in 1926 by a Serbian Orthodox priest in Leskovac, which is located in Svetoilijska Street. Heads of angels, which adorn the facade, still attract the attention of passers-by. The authors are co-architects Đura Bajalović, a very versatile and expeditious builder from the Ministry of Construction and Public Works of the Kingdom of Serbs, Croats and Slovenes, and Dimitrije Tasić, an architect by vocation and a lawyer by profession.
- Hotel Prag (Prague Hotel) in Belgrade was designed by Đura Bajalović. It was constructed in 1929 in the latest style of the time and was exhibited at the first Salon of Architecture that same year as the exhibition of Yugoslav contemporary architecture.
- In 1937 the Municipality of Belgrade organized an International Competition for the Design of Heir to the Throne Square and the first prize winners for its Master Plan went to architects Đura Bajalović, Branko Popović, Milan Nešić, Svetozar Genići, and Mihailo Radovanović.

== See also ==
- Milan Antonović
- Andra Stevanović
- Nikola Nestorović
- Aleksandar Bugarski
- Milan Antonović
- Danilo Vladisavljević
- Dragutin Dragiša Milutinović
- Momir Korunović
