= Svetozar Ivačković =

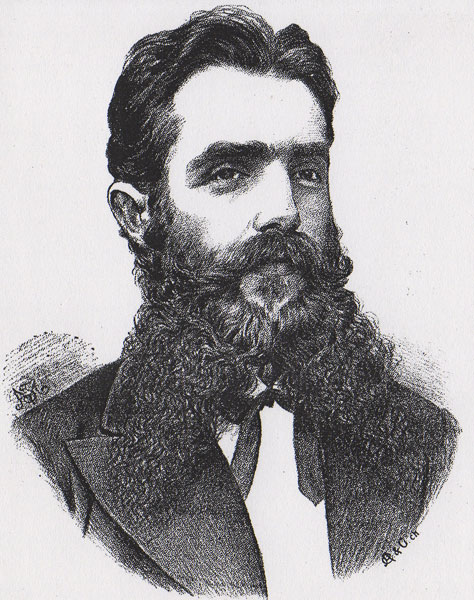
Светозар Ивачковић

Svetozar Ivačković (Serbian Cyrillic: Светозар Ивачковић) (December 10, 1844 – January 30, 1924) was a post-Romantic Serbian architect; the most famous representative of the first epoch of the Serbian-Byzantine architectural revival in Serbia. He, like many Serbian architects of his time, was educated in Vienna, then the centre of contemporary 19th century architecture. Ivačković's finest work, according to Pravoslavlje, the official magazine of the Serbian Orthodox Church, are the church of Transfiguration of Our Lord in Pančevo, built in 1877, and Saint Nicholas the Wonderworker church, located at the New Cemetery, better known as Novo Groblje, in Belgrade, built in 1893, thanks to the Draginja and Stanojlo Petrović Endowment Fund.
