= Krstić Brothers =

Serbian architects

Krstić Brothers of architectural fame: Petar Krstić and Branko Krstić (Petar; Belgrade, 24 December 1899 - Belgrade, 1991; and Branko; Belgrade, 15 December 1902 - Belgrade, 1978), were Serbian architects. They belonged to the "Serbian national style" as well as modernism of their time. Both Petar and Branko Krstić were also professors at the Faculty of Architecture of the University of Belgrade.

== Biographies ==
Both brothers were raised by their mother after their father died when they were very young. They never married or had families of their own but dedicated their lives to their profession and teaching at the university. Petar Krstić graduated from the Technical Faculty in Belgrade in 1924. He was a full professor in the subject of Architectural Construction, and Branko graduated in 1927 from the same faculty, assistant professor in the subject of Architectural Drawing in the period from 1949 until 1959. Petar Krstić wrote one of the most important textbooks at that faculty: "Architectural constructions" (in two volumes), and Branko Krstić wrote the textbook "Architectural drawing".

== Important works ==
- Pavilion of the Kingdom of Yugoslavia at the World's Fair in Philadelphia (1924-1925);
- Villa of Stevka Milićević in Belgrade at Užička 54 (1929-1930);
- Ms. Jelinić's residential building at 13 Kumanovska Street (1930-1931) in Belgrade;
- Agrarian Bank Building (1932-1934) in Belgrade;
- Church of St. Mark in Belgrade (1930-1939).
- Villa of Lazić and Mitrović in Belgrade (1931)
- Sima Igumanov Fund (1938)
- Kojić's Apartment building at Prizrenska Street.
