= Petar Bajalović =

Serbian architect

Petar Bajalović

Petar Bajalović (Serbian Cyrillic: Петар Бајаловић; 27 May 1876 — 14 April 1947) was a Serbian architect who lived and worked during the latter part of Belle Epoque and the Interwar period. He was one of the representatives of architectural modernism in Serbia.

== Biography ==
Born in Šabac, Petar Bajalović completed his Gymnasium education in Belgrade, after which he enrolled at the Technical Faculty of the Belgrade's Velika škola, graduating with a Bachelor of Science degree. He then went to Germany to pursue his post-graduate studies in architecture at the Technical College in Karlsruhe. There he graduated in 1905.

From 1906 until his death, he was a professor and founder of the descriptive geometry field of studies at the Faculty of Architecture of the University of Belgrade, where he distinguished himself as an excellent pedagogue. His daughter Jelena Bajalović took his courses there and in turn became an architect.

He constructed the pavilion for Kingdom of Serbia on International Exhibition of Art of 1911.

Petar Bajalović is the older brother of Đura Bajalović, who was also a prominent Belgrade architect.

== Oeuvres ==
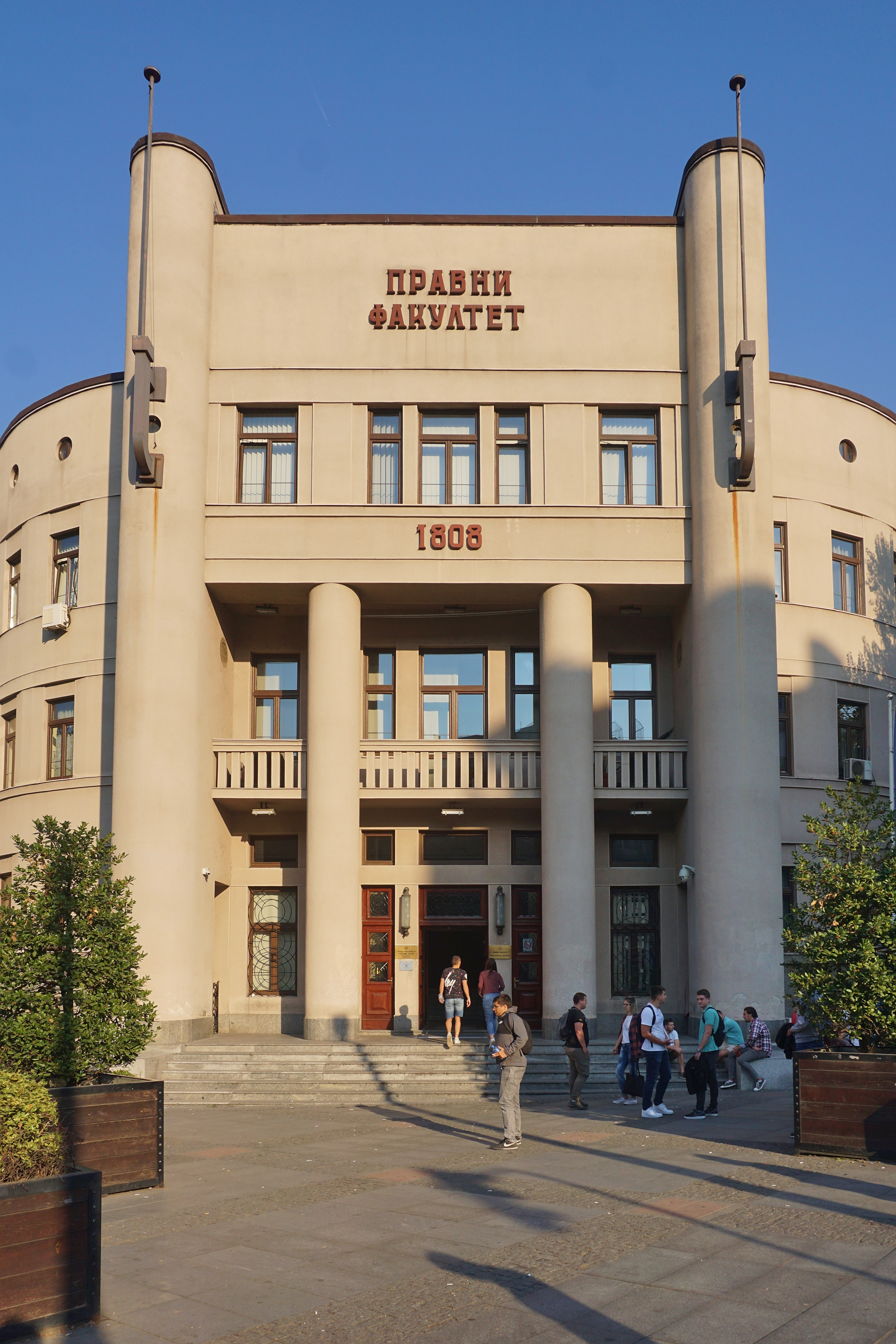
University of Belgrade Faculty of Law building

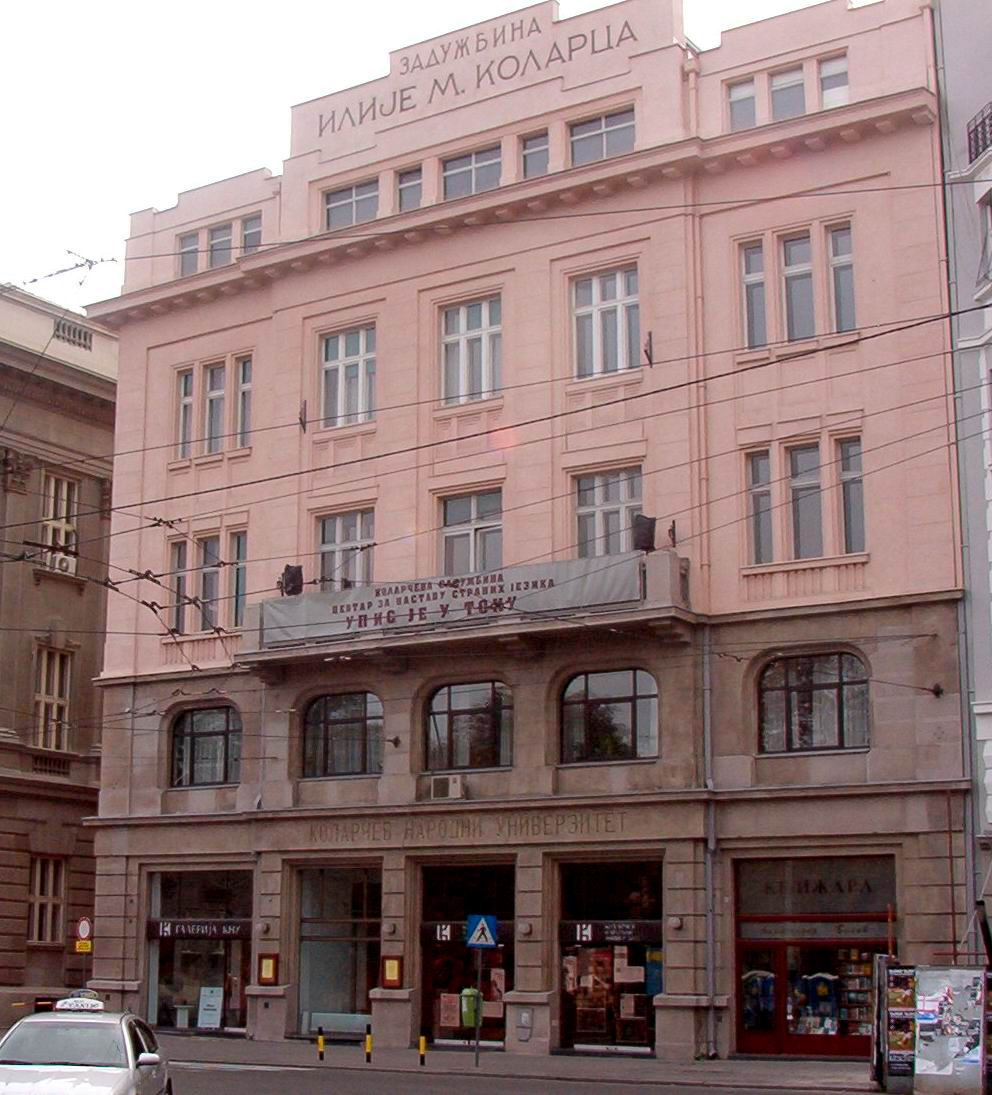
Ilija M. Kolarac Endowment

- Serbian Pavilion at the International Exhibition in Rome (1911-1912);
- Leona Panajot's house (31 rue Francuska, in Belgrade), completed in 1908, characteristic of Art Nouveau and now classified;
- The house of Mihailo Petrović Alas at 22 Kosančićev venac in Belgrade was completed in 1910; the house, also influenced by Art Nouveau, is today inscribed on the list of protected cultural monuments of the Republic of Serbia and on the list of protected cultural treasures of the City of Belgrade.
- the Stanković music school (1 Kneza Miloša street in Belgrade) was renovated by Petar Bajalović in 1913-1914; it is now classified as a Historical Monument;
- the house of Saint Sava in Belgrade (13 Cara Dušana street), was modified by Petar Bajalović in 1923 from the construction designed by Jovan Ilkić; the building is classified as a Historic Monument;
- the building of the Saint Sava Association in Belgrade (11 Cara Dušana street), completed in 1924 on plans of 1914, of academic style with a historicizing decoration, it is classified Historic monument;
- Ilija M. Kolarac Endowment (5 Studentski trg in Belgrade), completed in 1932; it is inscribed on the list of cultural treasures of the City of Belgrade;
- the Faculty of Law of the University of Belgrade, 1937-1940.

== See also ==
- List of Serbian architects
