= Nestor =

Nestor may refer to:

- Nestor (mythology), King of Pylos in Greek mythology

== Arts and entertainment ==
- "Nestor" (Ulysses episode) an episode in James Joyce's novel Ulysses
- Nestor Studios, first-ever motion picture studio in Hollywood, Los Angeles
- Nestor, the Long-Eared Christmas Donkey, a Christmas television program
- Nestor (band), Swedish rock band

== Locations ==
- Nestor, San Diego, a neighborhood of San Diego, California, US
- Mount Nestor (Antarctica), in the Achaean Range of Antarctica
- Mount Nestor (Alberta), a mountain in Alberta, Canada
- 659 Nestor, an asteroid

== People and fictional characters ==
- Nestor (surname), including a list of people
- Nestor (given name), including a list of people and fictional characters

== Science and technology ==
- Nestor (bird), a genus of parrots
- NESTOR Project, an international scientific collaboration for the deployment of a neutrino telescope
- NESTOR (encryption), a family of voice encryption devices used by the United States during the Vietnam War era

== Ships ==
- HMS Nestor, three Royal Navy ships, one of which was used by the Royal Australian Navy in the Second World War as HMAS Nestor
- SS Nestor, a number of ships of this name
- MV Nestor, an LNG carrier
- Nestor (sternwheeler), a steamboat that operated in Oregon and Washington State

== Other uses ==
- Nestor (solitaire), a card game
- List of storms named Nestor
- A West Cornwall Railway steam locomotive

== See also ==
- Dniester, a river in Eastern Europe
- Nester (disambiguation)
- Nestori, a given name
- Nestorianism, a Christian theological doctrine condemned as heretical at the Council of Ephesus in 431
- Nestorius, Ecumenical Patriarch of Constantinople 428–431
