= Dragutin Đorđević =

Serbian architect

Dragutin Đorđević (Loznica, Serbia, August 22, 1866 – Belgrade, Serbia, Kingdom of Yugoslavia, April 9, 1933) was a Serbian architect and university professor who worked during the last decade of the Belle Époque and the interwar period. He was a corresponding member of the Royal Academy of Arts and Sciences from February 16, 1920. His work is characteristic of the academic art and eclectic styles in Serbia.

== Biography ==
Karlsruhe and Berlin-trained Đorđević was a well-established professor from the first generation of Belgrade architecture faculty who received a commission for the Belgrade University Library based on his pre-World War I reputation. His collaborator on the 1919–1926 project was architect Nikola Nestorović, also Karlsruhe and Berlin-trained.

Even before he embarked on Belgrade University Library, he and his colleague Andra Stevanović both received a commission in 1912 to design the plans for the building of the Serbian Royal Academy in Kneza Mihaila Street no. 35. The project was completed in 1924. Today the monumental building of the highest scientific institution in the country is one of the most representative buildings in the spirit of Secession reform and French decorativism of Belgrade architecture.

Other equally lucrative commissions followed suit from the Ministry of Construction and Public Works while he was employed as a professor of architecture at his alma mater -- the University of Belgrade.

== Achievements in Belgrade ==
Among his best-known achievements is the building of the Third Belgrade Gymnasium constructed in 1906 in collaboration with Dušan Živanović in an academic style; the building is now included in the list of Cultural monuments of great importance in Serbia of the Republic of Serbia and is also on the list of cultural goods of the city of Belgrade.

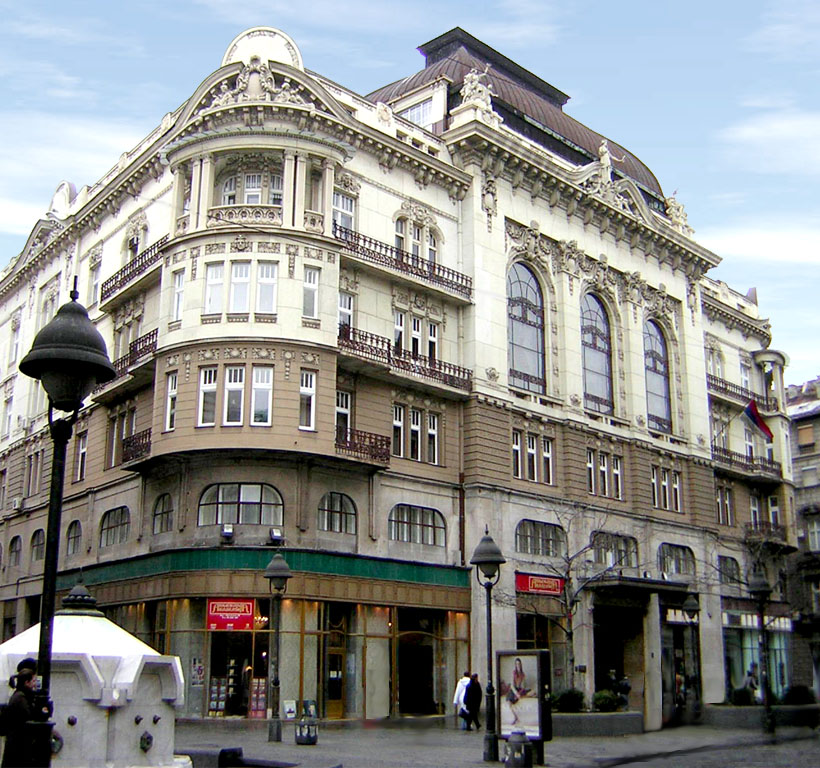
The building of the Serbian Academy of Sciences and Arts

The building of the Serbian Academy of Sciences and Arts, located in the street Knez Mihailova was constructed in 1912 in collaboration with the architect Andra Stevanović; the building is characterized by its eclectic style which mixes academicism neoclassical, neobaroque and Art Nouveau; Due to its value, the Academy is on the list of Protected cultural monuments in Serbia of the Republic of Serbia and on the list of protected cultural property of the City of Belgrade. Dragutin Đorđević also built the Barracks of the 7th regiment in Belgrade, inscribed on the list of cultural goods of the Serbian capital

Characteristic of the academic stream of the interwar years, the Svetozar Marković University Library at 71 Bulevar kralja Aleksandra , was completed in 1926 also from plans by Dragutin Đorđević and Nikola Nestorović

All the buildings mentioned are inscribed on the list of the cultural heritage of Serbia and protected as such.
