= Nestor (given name) =

- Gender: male

Origin
- Meaning: homecoming (Greek)

Other names
- Nickname: Nes
- Related names: Nessie

Nestor, or Néstor, is a given name of Greek origin. In Greek mythology it comes from that of Nestor, the son of Neleus, the King of Pylos and Chloris. The Greek derivation is from a combination of νέομαι, néomai, 'go back', and νόστος, nóstos, 'one who returns from travels'.

The name is also found in Russia, Portugal, and France, with variants in Finland (Nestori), Italy (Nestore), and Spain (Néstor).

== People with the name ==
- Nestor of Gaza (died c. 362), early Christian martyr
- Nestor of Laranda (2nd–3rd centuries), Greek poet
- Nestor of Magydos or Saint Nestor, Christian saint (died 250)
- Nestor of Thessaloniki, another saint (died c. 300)
- Nestor the Chronicler (c. 1056 – c. 1114), reputed author of the earliest East Slavic chronicle
- Néstor Almendros (1930–1992), Oscar-winning cinematographer
- Nestor Binabo (died 2023), Nigerian politician
- Néstor Botero (1919-1996), Colombian journalist, writer and merchant
- Nestor Carbonell (born 1967), American actor
- Nestor Cortés Jr. (born 1994), Cuban-American professional baseball player
- Nestor de Almeida (1907–1992), Brazilian football goalkeeper
- Nestor Forster (1963–), Brazilian diplomat
- Néstor García (disambiguation), multiple people
- Néstor Bordiola (born 1984), Argentine cumbia villera singer
- Nestor Ignat (1918–2016), Romanian journalist and writer
- Nestory Irankunda (born 2006), also known as Nestor, Australian professional football player
- Néstor Kirchner (1950–2010), Former President of Argentina
- Nestor Kukolnik (1809–1868), Russian writer
- Nestor Lakoba (1893–1936), Bolshevik leader in Abkhazia
- Nestor Makhno (1888–1934), 20th-century Ukrainian anarcho-communist
- Néstor Martín-Fernández de la Torre (1887–1938), Spanish painter from the Canary Islands
- Nestor Mendez (born 1971), Belizean politician and diplomat
- Néstor Ortigoza (born 1984), Paraguayan footballer
- Néstor Pitana (born 1975), Argentine football referee and former actor
- Néstor Rego (born 1962), Galician politician
- Nestor Roqueplan (1805–1870), French writer
- Nestor Serrano (born 1955), American actor
- Nestor J. Zaluzec (born 1952), American scientist

== Fictional characters ==
- Nestor, a group consciousness in the 1980 movie Battle Beyond the Stars
- Nestor, the donkey character in 1977 Japanese-American animated television Christmas special Nestor, the Long-Eared Christmas Donkey
- Nestor, in the 2007 animated television series Shorty McShorts' Shorts
- Nestor, in the 2011 animated television series Scaredy Squirrel
- Néstor, a penguin in the 2006 film Happy Feet
- Nestor, a butler and reoccurring character in the Tintin franchise
- Nestor 10, the NS-series robot in the series of short-stories I, Robot, by Isaac Asimov
- Nestor Burma, created by French crime novelist Léo Malet
- Nestor Cunningham, a minor protagonist in the 1990 film Tremors
- Nestor Willow, husband of Clarice Willow, in the 2010 TV series Caprica
- Prince Nestor, in the animated television series 2008 World of Quest
- Nestor Kraken, father of Alex Kraken in intersex movie "XXY"

== See also ==
- Nestor (surname)
- Nestorović
- Nestorius (c.386–c.451), Patriarch of Constantinople, 428–431
