= Hotel Bristol, Belgrade =

Hotel in Belgrade, Serbia

The Bristol Belgrade
- Бристол Београд
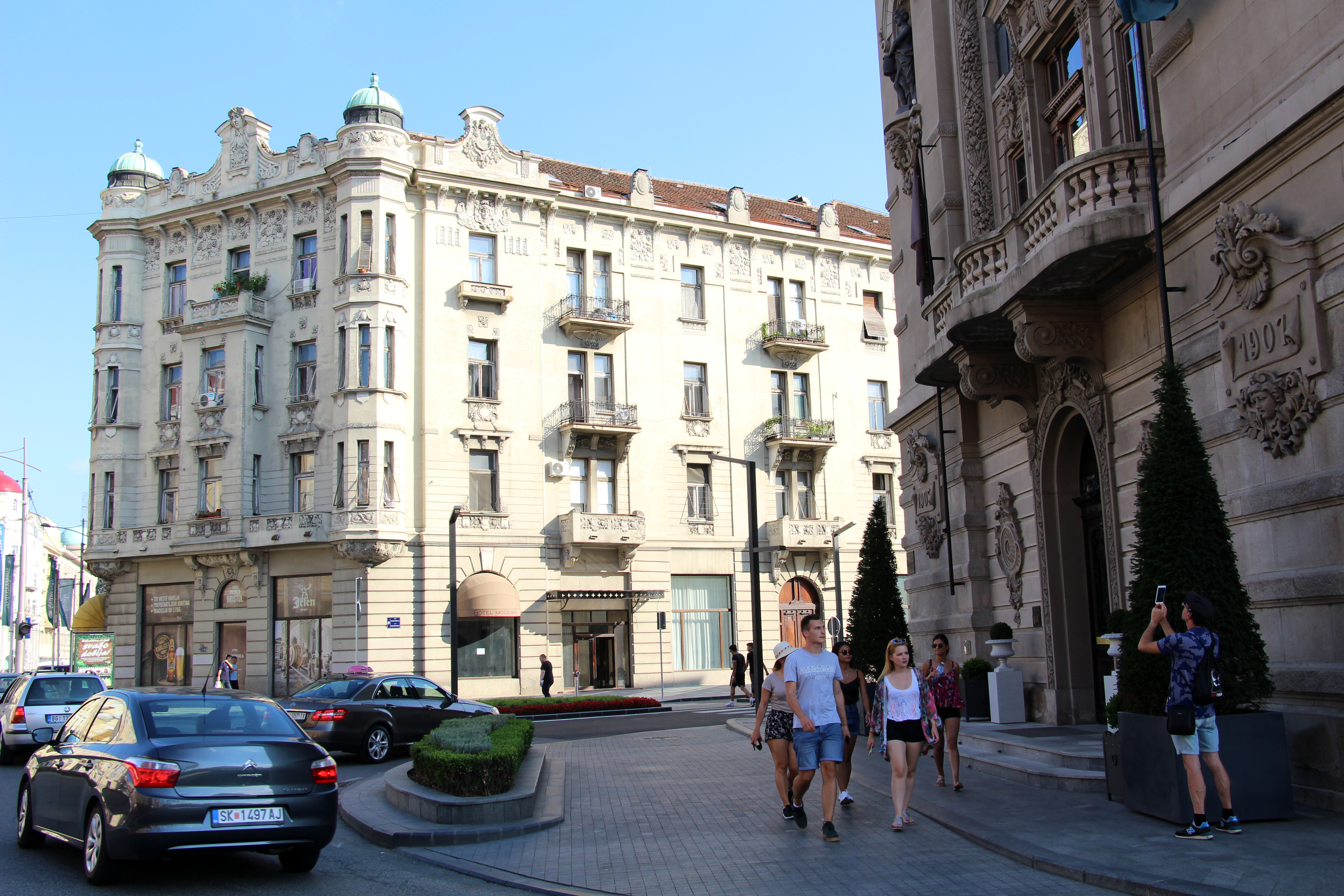
- Main entrance

- Location within Belgrade

General information
- Location: 50 Karađorđeva street Belgrade; Serbia
- Coordinates: 44.812686°N 20.452768°E
- Opening: 1912; 114 years ago
- Owner: Government of the Republic of Serbia
- Operator: Military Institution "Dedinje"

Technical details
- Floor count: 4

Design and construction
- Architect: Nikola Nestorović

Other information
- Number of rooms: 143
- Number of suites: 16
- Number of restaurants: 2

Website
- The Bristol Belgrade (in English)

The Bristol Belgrade (Serbian Cyrillic: Бристол Београд) is one of the oldest hotels in Belgrade, the capital of Serbia. Built in 1912, it is an anthological exemplar of the modern architecture in Belgrade and represents the pinnacle of the Secession architecture in the city. The building was declared a cultural monument in 1987. In early 2025, after extensive restoration works, Hotel Bristol reopened as The Bristol Belgrade, a five star luxury hotel with 143 rooms and suites, a spa and three restaurants and bars.

== Location ==
The hotel is located in the neighborhood of Savamala, in the municipality of Savski Venac. The building occupies the entire block bounded by the streets of Karađorđeva, Hercegovačka, Zvornička and Hadži-Nikole Živkovića. South and southeast of the hotel are the incoming platforms of the Main Belgrade Bus Station and the Park Bristol. North of the hotel is the building of the Belgrade Cooperative.

== History ==
Situated near the "Small Market" (Mali pijac), predecessor of the hotel was the "Paranos khan". In the early 20th century, Savamala was being transformed from the neighborhood with the small, curvy alleys into the Belgrade's most affluent quarter, especially when it comes to the architecture. The khan was demolished and the construction of the new building lasted from 1910 to 1912. It was built as the building for the Insurance and Credit Association of the Belgrade Cooperative, owned by Luka Ćelović.

Hotel Bristol soon became the center of the fashionable life, not only of Belgrade, but of the entire Serbia and, later, Yugoslavia. Before the outbreak of the World War I, it was very popular among the guests from Austria-Hungary. Guests included the members of the Rockefeller family, Garry Kasparov, members of the British Royal family, numerous diplomats, officers, etc. The Rockefellers stayed at the hotel several times. John D. Rockefeller Jr. visited in the 1920s so as later did his son, David Rockefeller. He stayed in the apartment which is today named after him. David's son, David Jr., also stayed in the hotel in 1979. One of the most famous Serbian folk singers, Cune Gojković, started his career in Hotel Bristol.

In the 1960s, the administration of the hotel was awarded to the military, but the government remained an owner.

The façade was reconstructed in 1977 while the interior has been partially renovated in 1985-90. Since then, the hotel became known for the single room occupancy, as many members of the army which were exiled from the former Yugoslav republics after the outbreak of the Yugoslav wars, were settled in the hotel. The hotel is today owned by the Serbian Defense Ministry and operated by the ministry's "Dedinje" institution.

The park next to the hotel was originally called Nikoljski (Saint Nicholas' park after the nearby Svetonikolski Trg (Square of the Saint Nicholas), but in time, the name was gradually replaced with Park Bristol, after the hotel.

== Architecture ==
The hotel was projected by Nikola Nestorović and from the beginning was envisioned as the representative edifice. Apart from the hotel premises and shops on the ground floor, it was planned as the residential building, too. The only modern hotel build in Belgrade prior to Bristol was the Hotel Moskva, built in 1906. The tallest building in the city upon its construction, it highly influenced the look of the Hotel Bristol, especially when it comes to the façade. The fronts of both buildings are almost identical while the façade in the Karađorđeva street is identical to Moskva's.

The architectural characteristics of the building are highly regarded. It is qualified as an anthological exemplar of the modern architecture in Belgrade and described as the pinnacle of the Secession architecture in the city. The building was declared a cultural monument in 1987.

== Characteristics ==
The Bristol Belgrade after reopening in 2025 has 143 bedrooms and suites; 90 Deluxe rooms (3 accessible rooms with single beds, 35- Queen bed, 14- twin beds, 30- king bed, 8- super king bed), 37 Superior Deluxe rooms (21- king bed,2- twin beds,14- super king bed), 16 Suites (5- Deluxe suites, 5- Corner Deluxe Suites, 3- Grand Deluxe Suites, 2- The Bristol (Signature) Suites, 1- The Royal Suite)

== Historically ==
Historically, The Hotel Bristol had 52 rooms (3 three-bed, 39 two-bed and 10 one-bed), 11 apartments (5 small, 3 large, 2 lux and the "Golden" or the "Rockefeller" apartment). There where also an aperitif bar, two national cuisine restaurants with 250 seats, beer lounge with 40 seats, "Little Salon" with 55 seats and the pastry shop. The Golden or the Rockefeller suite was the most luxurious in the hotel, and the largest, with 70 m^{2} (750 sq ft). It was equipped with the Louis XVI style furniture, including the golden-framed mirror from the 18th century. It was used as the location of many music videos and photo-editorials.

== Awards Won ==
The Bristol Belgrade is the recipient of the prestigious MICHELIN Key 2025, placing it on the global map of luxury hotels and recognizing its commitment to high-quality service and exceptional guest experiences.

== Future ==
Following its official reopening in 2025 after an extensive restoration project, The Bristol Belgrade has entered a new phase as a fully operational hotel. The property, now repositioned as an independent five-star luxury hotel, aims to contribute to the revival of Belgrade's historic Savamala district. The hotel features 143 rooms and suites, a restaurant, lounge, wellness facilities, and meeting spaces, while maintaining elements of its original architectural character, protected under heritage conservation regulations.

Future plans include the continued development of cultural and community partnerships, as well as the integration of new technologies to enhance operational efficiency and guest services. The hotel is also expected to play a role in Belgrade’s broader tourism strategy ahead of EXPO 2027, for which the city is the official host.

== Gallery ==
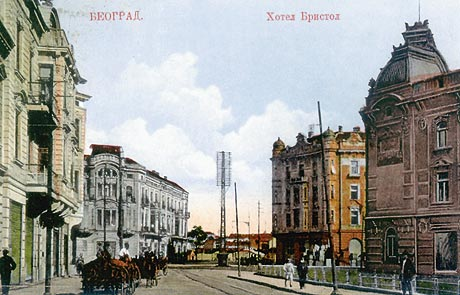

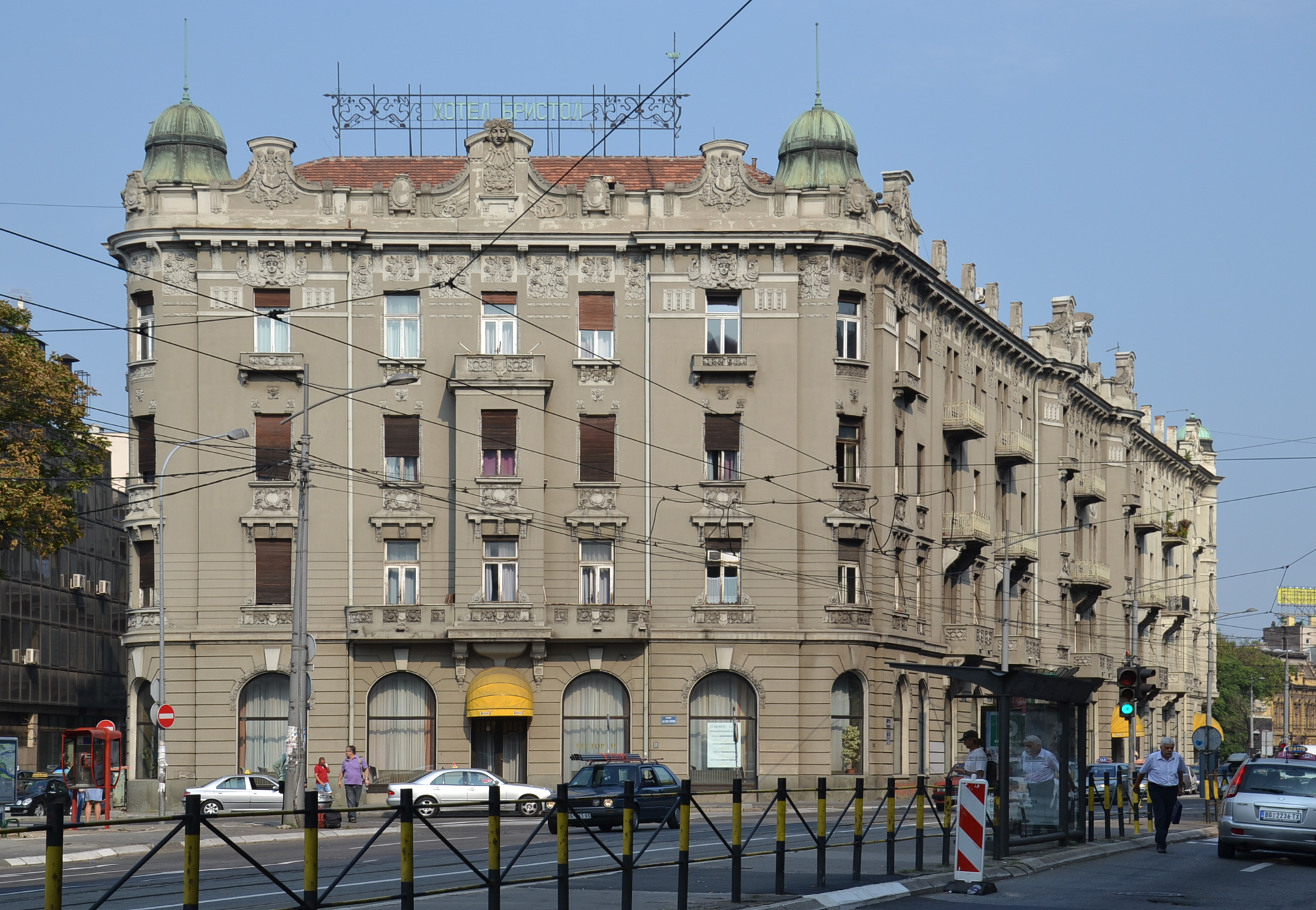

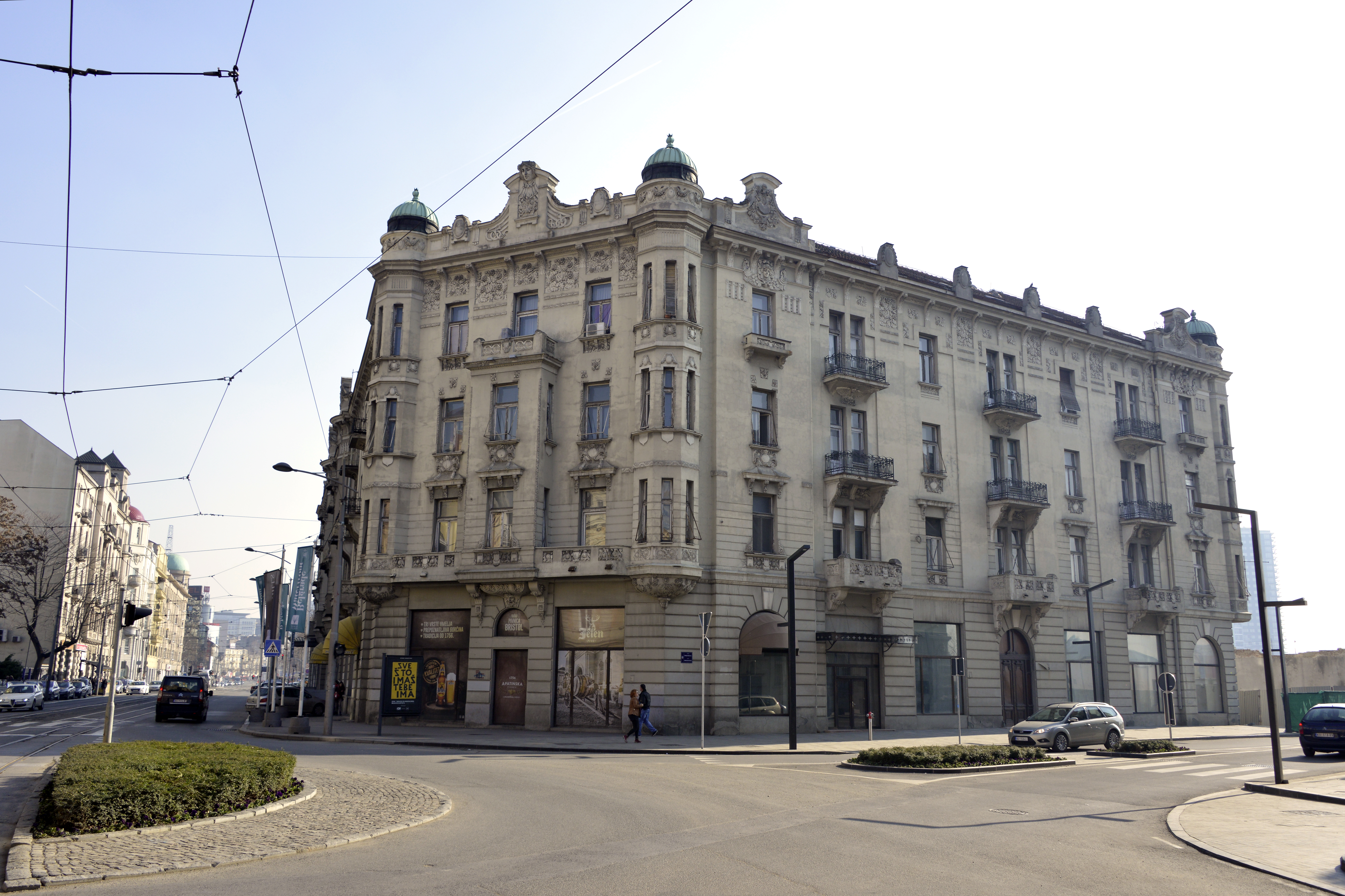

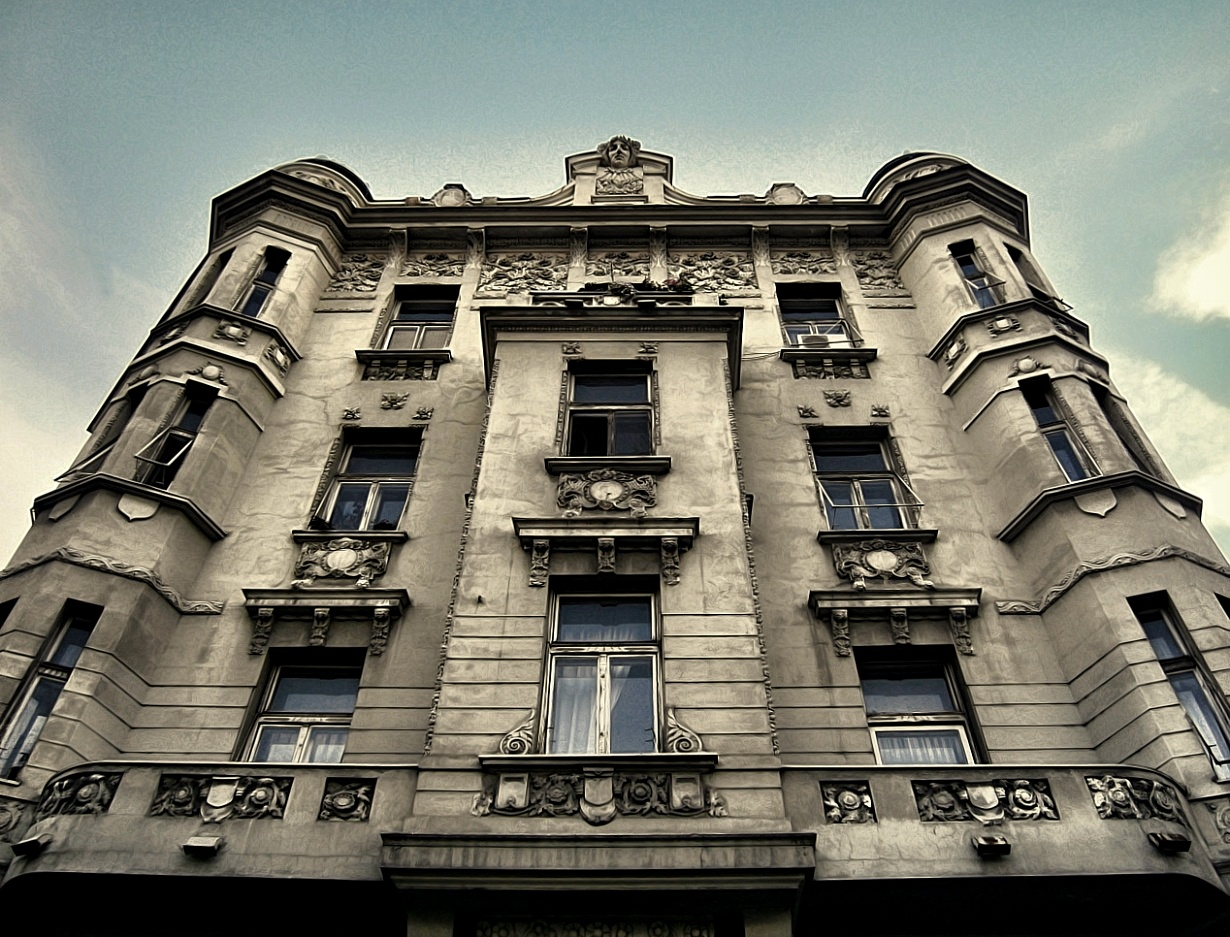

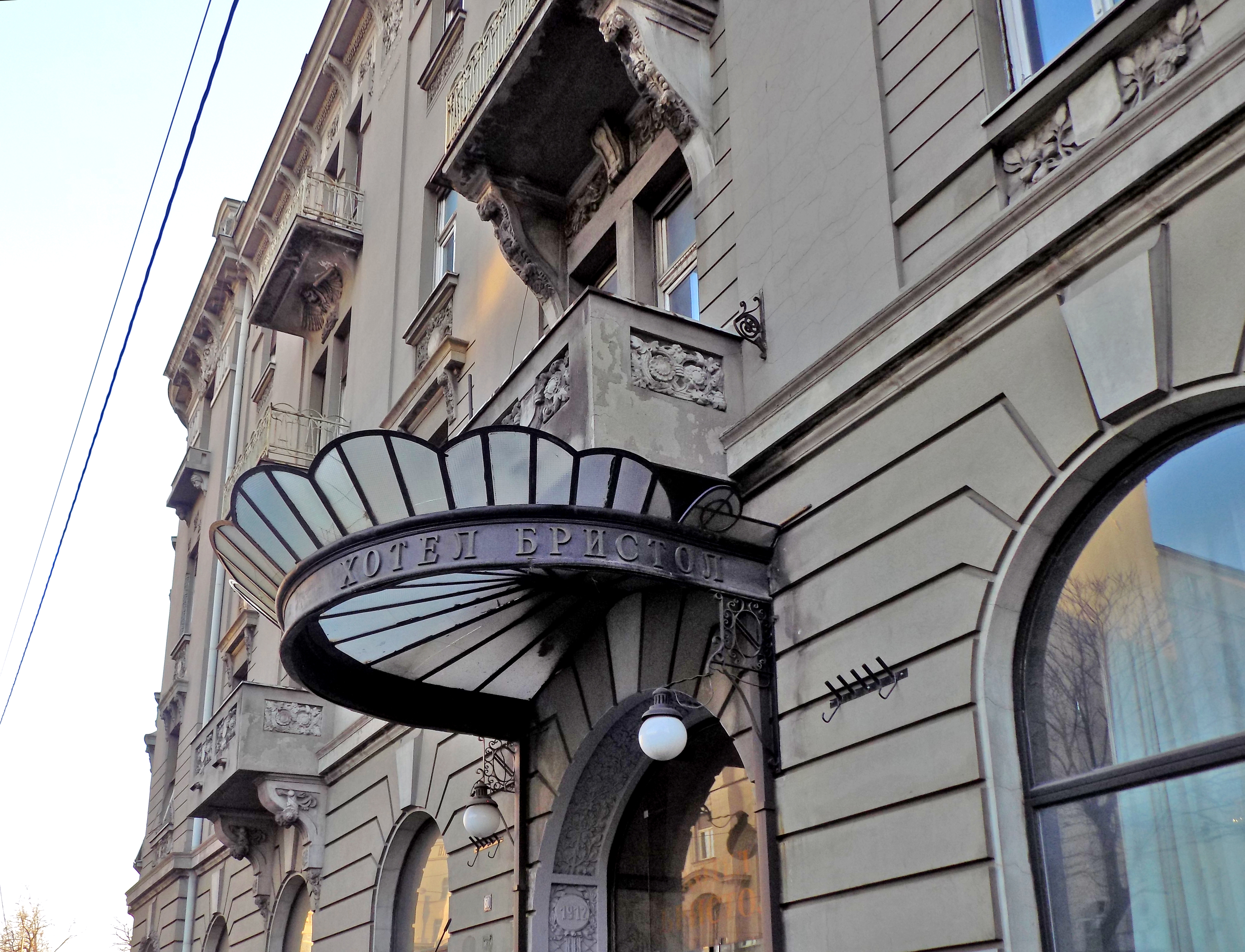

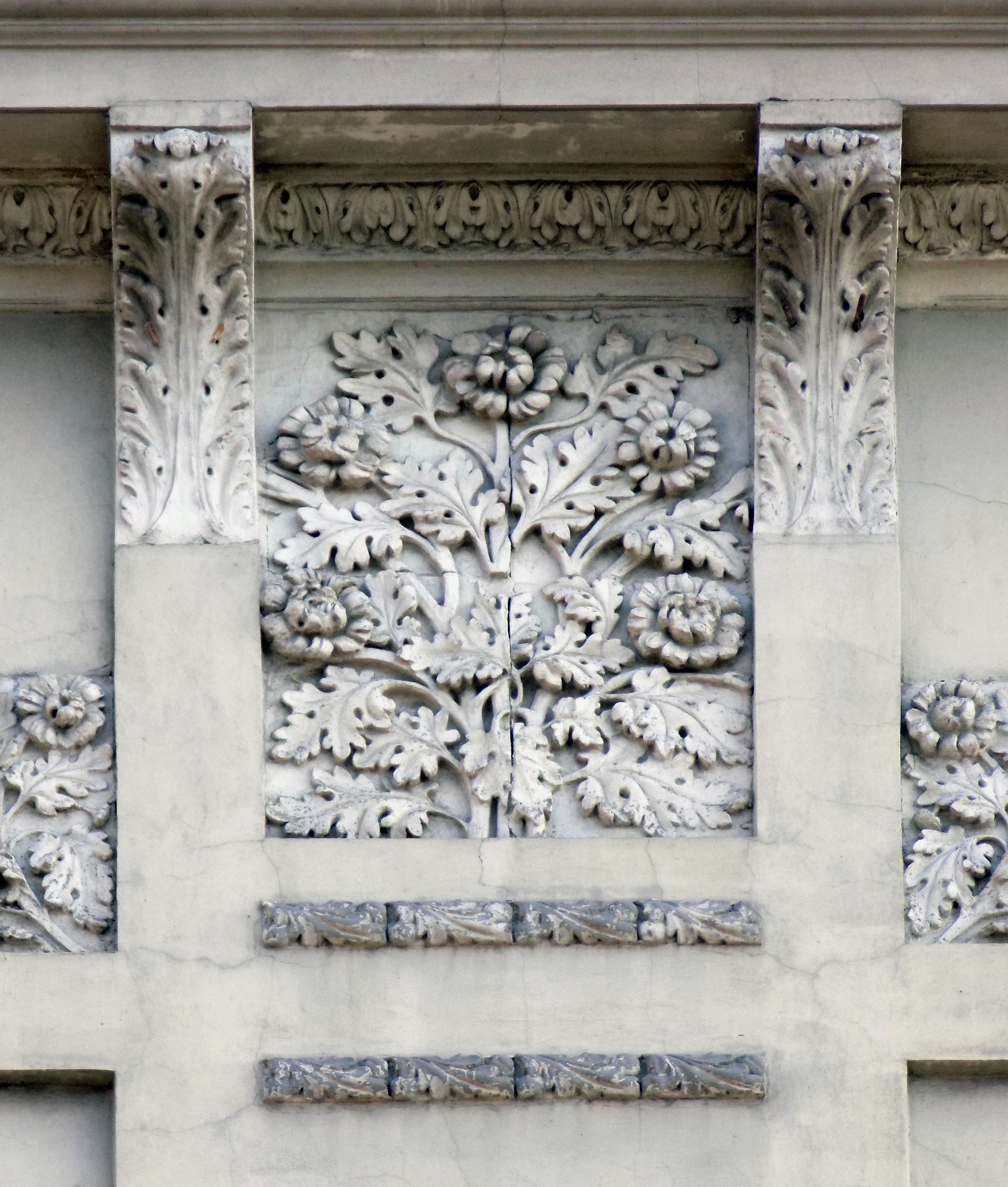

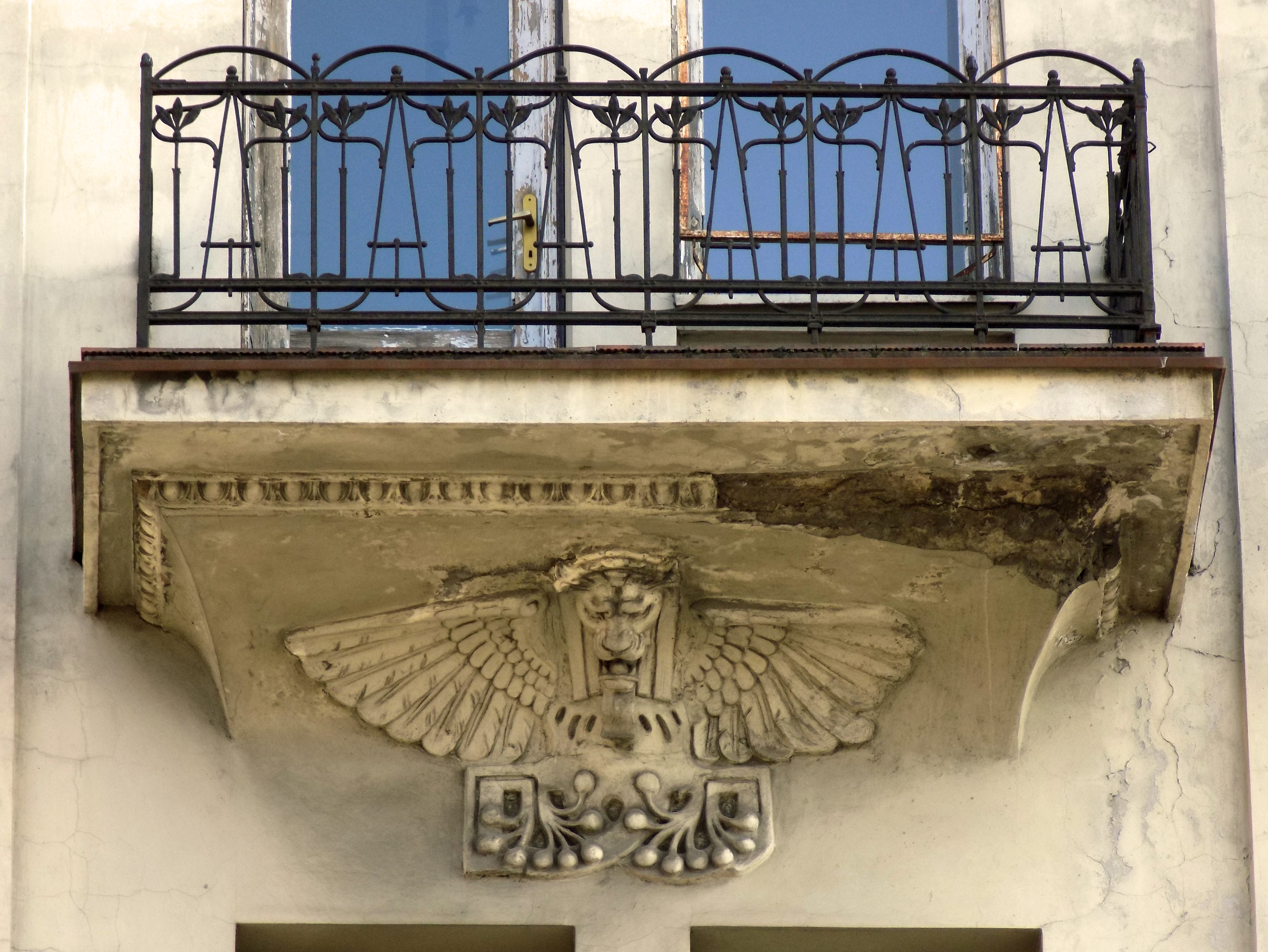

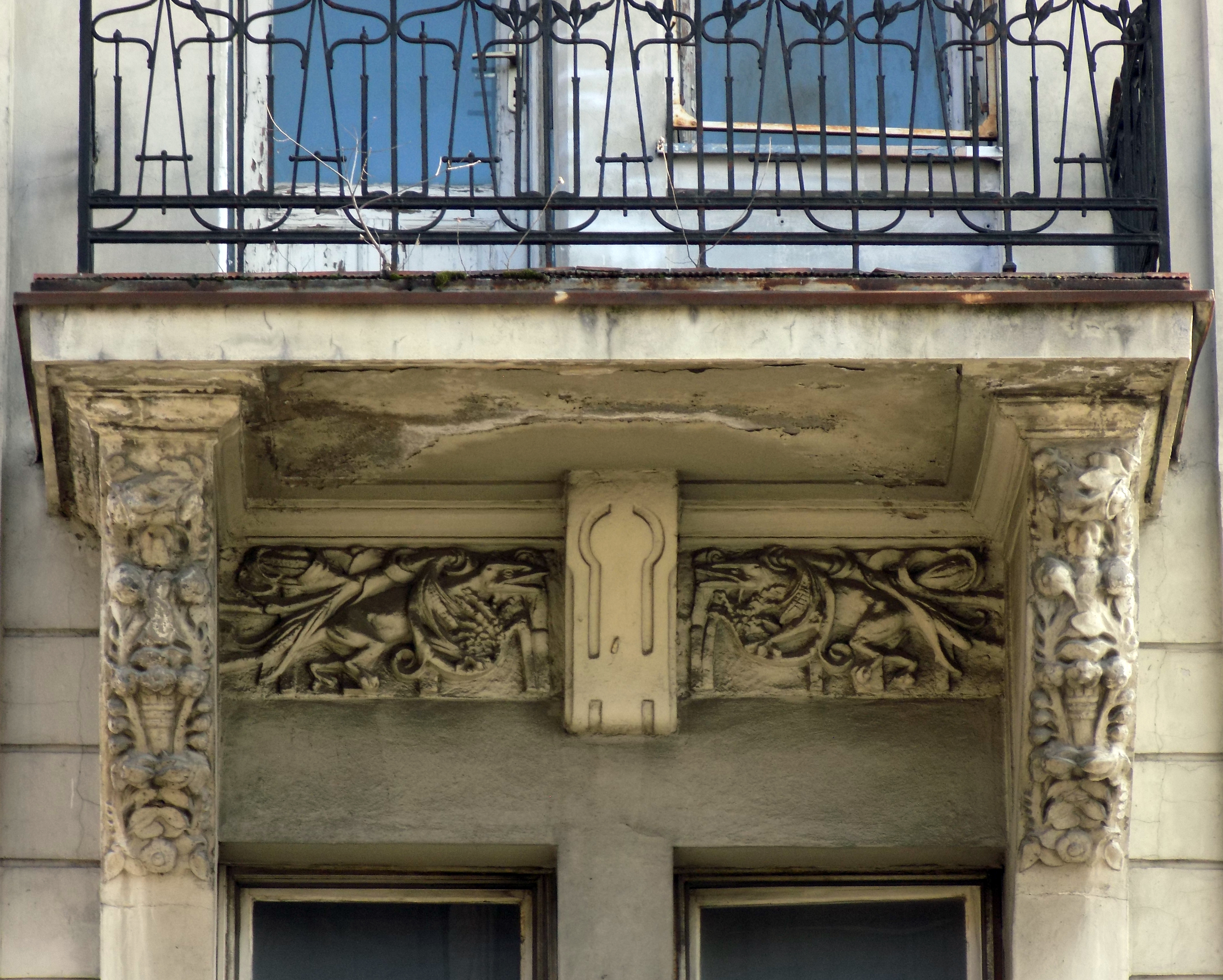
