= Nestori =

Surname list

Nestori is the given name of the following people:

- Nestori Aronen (1876–1954), Finnish politician
- Nestori Järvelä (1893–1951), Finnish middle-distance runner
- Nestori Kaasalainen (1915–2016), Finnish politician
- Nestori Karhula (1893–1971), Finnish-Australian farmer and Jaeger lieutenant
- Nestori Lähde (born 1989), Finnish ice hockey player
- Nestori Nättinen (1857–1932), Finnish politician
- Nestori Nurminen (1907–1977), Finnish politician
- Nestori Toivonen (1865–1927), Finnish sport shooter

== See also ==
- Nestor (disambiguation)
