= Nester =

Nester may refer to:

- Nester Township, Michigan
- Nester (character), the long-time teenage mascot and comic strip star of Nintendo Power magazine

== See also ==
- Nestor (disambiguation)
