= Nestor (surname) =

Nestor is, apart from a given name, also found as a surname borne by Irish and Estonians.

In Ireland, it was derived as a shortened form of Mac Girr an Adhastair, meaning son of the short man of the bridle. It was sometimes shortened to Mac an Adhastair. The surname is most common in County Galway and County Clare. The clan were natives of Corcomroe in the latter county, which in the Middle Ages formed the north-westernmost territory of the kingdom of Thomond. The Mac Girr an Adhastair were associated with the local lords, the Ó Lochlainn family.

Notable people with the surname include:

- Agnes Nestor (1880–1948), American labor leader and social reformer
- Daniel Nestor (born 1972), Canadian grand slam winning tennis player
- Eddie Nestor (born 1964), broadcaster and comedian
- Eiki Nestor (born 1953), Estonian politician
- Ernie Nestor (1946–2025), American basketball coach
- Ion Nestor (1905–1974), Romanian archaeologist
- John Nestor (1912–1999), American medical officer and whistleblower
- John Nestor (American football) (born 2005), American football player
- Kelly Nestor (born 1968), Australian newsreader
- Pam Nestor (born 1948), British lyricist, singer and actress
- Rodrigo Nestor (born 2000), Brazilian footballer

== See also ==
- Nestorović, Serbian surname
