= Third Belgrade Gymnasium =

- Трећа београдска гимназија (Serbian)
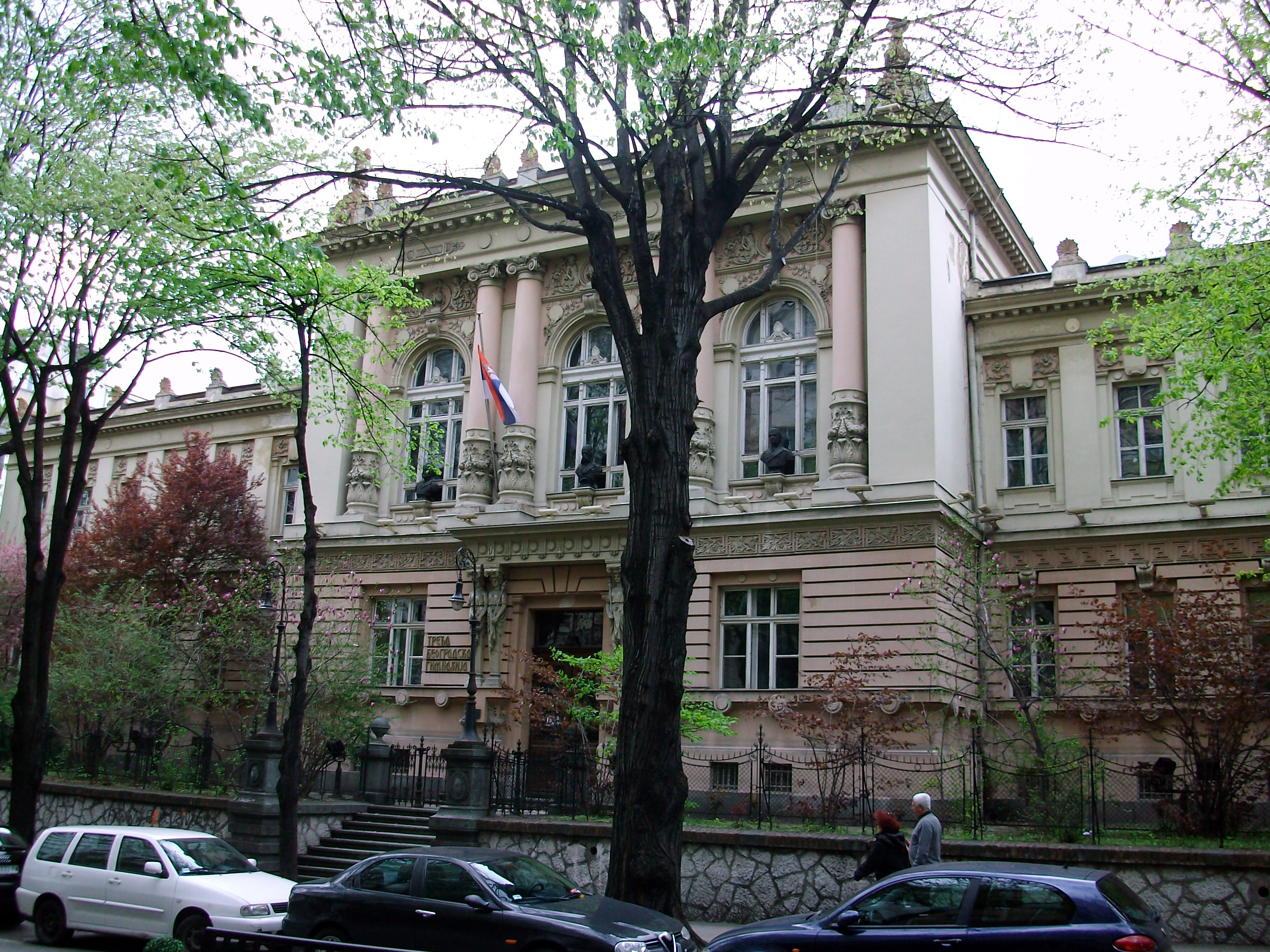
- Interactive map of Third Belgrade Gymnasium
- 44°48′19″N 20°28′00″E
- Location: Belgrade, 11000, Serbia

The Third Belgrade Gymnasium (Note: Serbian: Трећа београдска гимназија, Treća beogradska gimnazija) is located at 15 Njegoševa street, in Belgrade. The building has the status of a cultural monument of great importance.

== History ==
The Third Belgrade High School was constructed in 1906. The building was designed by Architects Dušan Živanović and Dragutin Đorđević. The construction work was carried out by Vasa Tešić. Architectural plastic was carried out by Francis Waldman. The painted decoration of the interior was done by Dragutin Inkiostri Medenjak and gingerbread by Paško Vučetić.

== Architecture ==
This architecture is designed in an academic style. The building possesses a ground floor, as well as the first floor. It is designed as a free structure, withdrawn to the street, with a basis in the form of the Cyrillic letter "Ш". The concept includes a major longitudinal tract, with prominent central projection, and three transverse backyard wings, of which is a medium significantly shorter. The facade is based on strictly conducted classical symmetry. The central projection of the main facade is very pronounced, as part of the caryatids on the entrance portal of the building. Columns are duplicated on the floor, together with a rich plastic decoration of windows and three bronze busts - Dositej Obradovic, Vuk Karadzic, Joseph Pančić, of renowned sculptor Petar Ubavkić. The building of the Third Belgrade Gymnasium was nominated for Cultural Monument in 1964.

== See also ==
- University of Belgrade
