= Lohtaja =

Former municipality in Central Ostrobothnia, Finland

Coordinates: 64°01′25″N 23°30′20″E

Coat of arms of Lohtaja

Location of Lohtaja in Finland

Lohtaja (Swedish: Lochteå) is a former municipality of Finland. Lohtaja was consolidated with the city of Kokkola on January 1, 2009.

It is located in the province of Western Finland and is part of the Central Ostrobothnia region. The former municipality had a population of 2,900 (2003) and covered an area of 289.26 km² of which 3.33 km² was water. The population density was 10.0 inhabitants per km². The municipality was unilingually Finnish.

Lohtaja is popular for its coastline, Vattajaniemi, which is the longest beach in Scandinavia. However, the coastline is partly used by the military as a drill-area. An association called Pro Vattaja was founded to campaign for the area to be saved for civil use. Ohtakari fishing village is located at Vattajaniemi.

== Notable people born in Lohtaja ==
- Nestori Karhula (1893–1971), Finnish-Australian farmer and Jaeger lieutenant
