= Building of Merchant Stamenković =

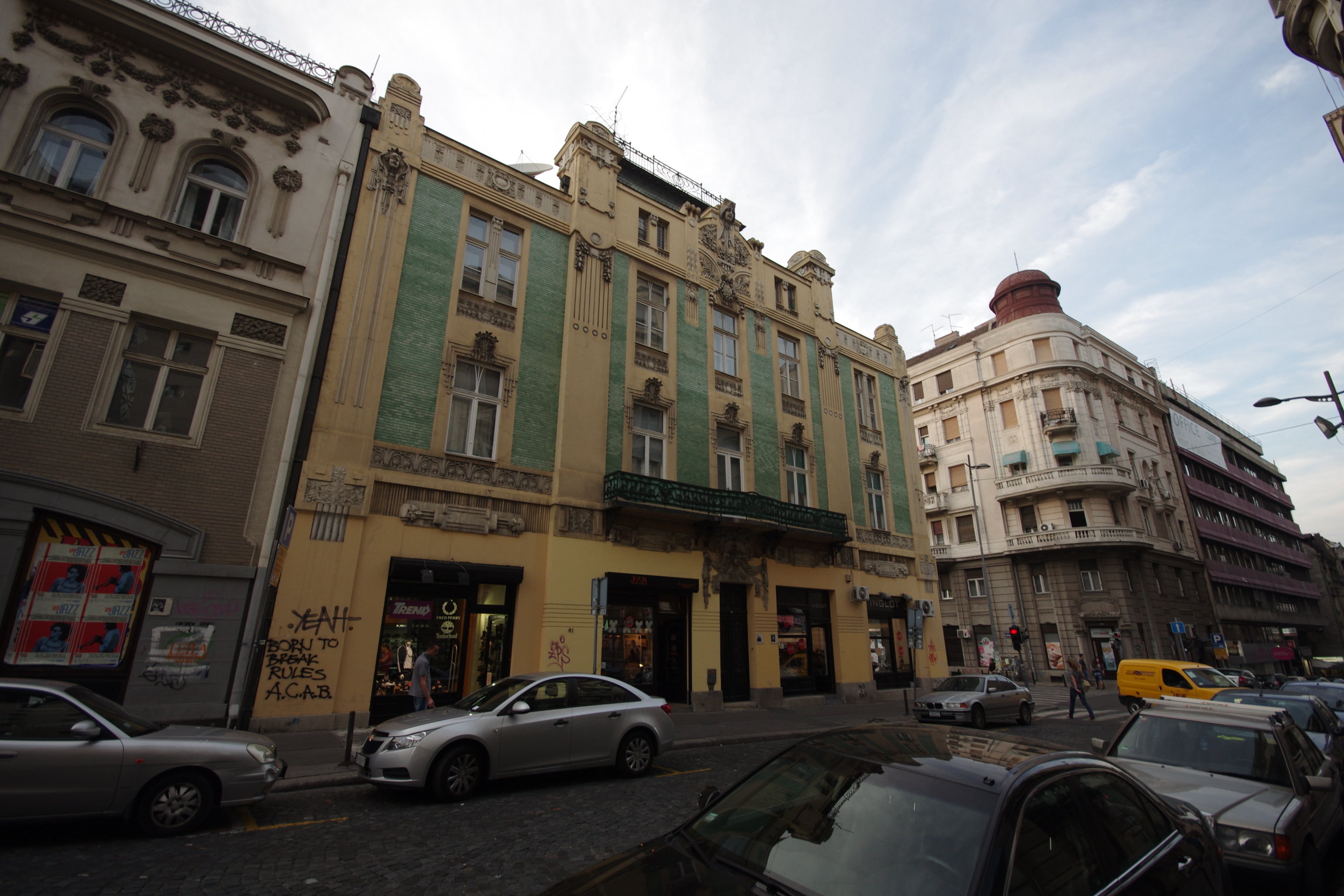
- Building of Merchant Stamenković Belgrade
- Interactive map of the Building of Merchant Stamenković area

General information
- Type: Cultural monument of exceptional importance
- Location: Belgrade, Serbia
- Coordinates: 44°49′13″N 20°27′19″E
- Completed: 1907

Building of Merchant Stamenković (Serbian: Зграда трговца Стаменковића, romanized: Zgrada trgovica Stamenkovića) is located in Belgrade, in 41, Kralja Petra Street and it has the status of a cultural monument. The building of Merchant Stamenković was built in 1907 according to the project by the architects Аndra Stevanović and Nikola Nestorović. The building is a combination of academic conception and Art Nouveau decoration, so that it belongs to a group of residential buildings built before the First World War in Belgrade.

== History ==
The position of the house on the corner of Kralja Petra Street and Uzun Mirko Street is not randomly chosen, given that Kralja Petra Street was the main trading street in Belgrade and that it was paramount for all of Belgrade's merchants that they have their shop or business premises in this very city street. Thus, merchant Stamenković foresaw shops on the ground floor, and housing on the floors, which is a still ongoing division. Merchant S. Stamenković belonged to a family of skin merchants who came to Belgrade from Vranje in the mid-19th century. They were very successful in their work, and they even exported to many countries. Thanks to their acquired possessions, they were owners of many estates in Belgrade and they also established a bank that had branches abroad.

== Architecture ==
The building of merchant Stamenković belongs to the group of residential buildings which were constructed in Belgrade before World War I, on which the combination of academic conception and Art Nouveau decoration was achieved. At the time, the style of the Vienna and the Munich Art Nouveau was popular in Belgrade – the system of new decoration based mainly on the motif of floral origin. So the head and the cornices made of stucco and terracotta, the ornaments and geometrical ornaments found their place on the facades. This style was particularly close to the merchants, bankers and entrepreneurs, as well as architects who were tired of the academy, and this style won Belgrade facades to a lesser or greater extent and encouraged modernization of its architecture. At the same time, new building material, reinforced concrete, appeared in Serbia, which the architects Nikola Nestorović and Andra Stevanović used to experiment, even before the house with green tiles.

== Gallery ==
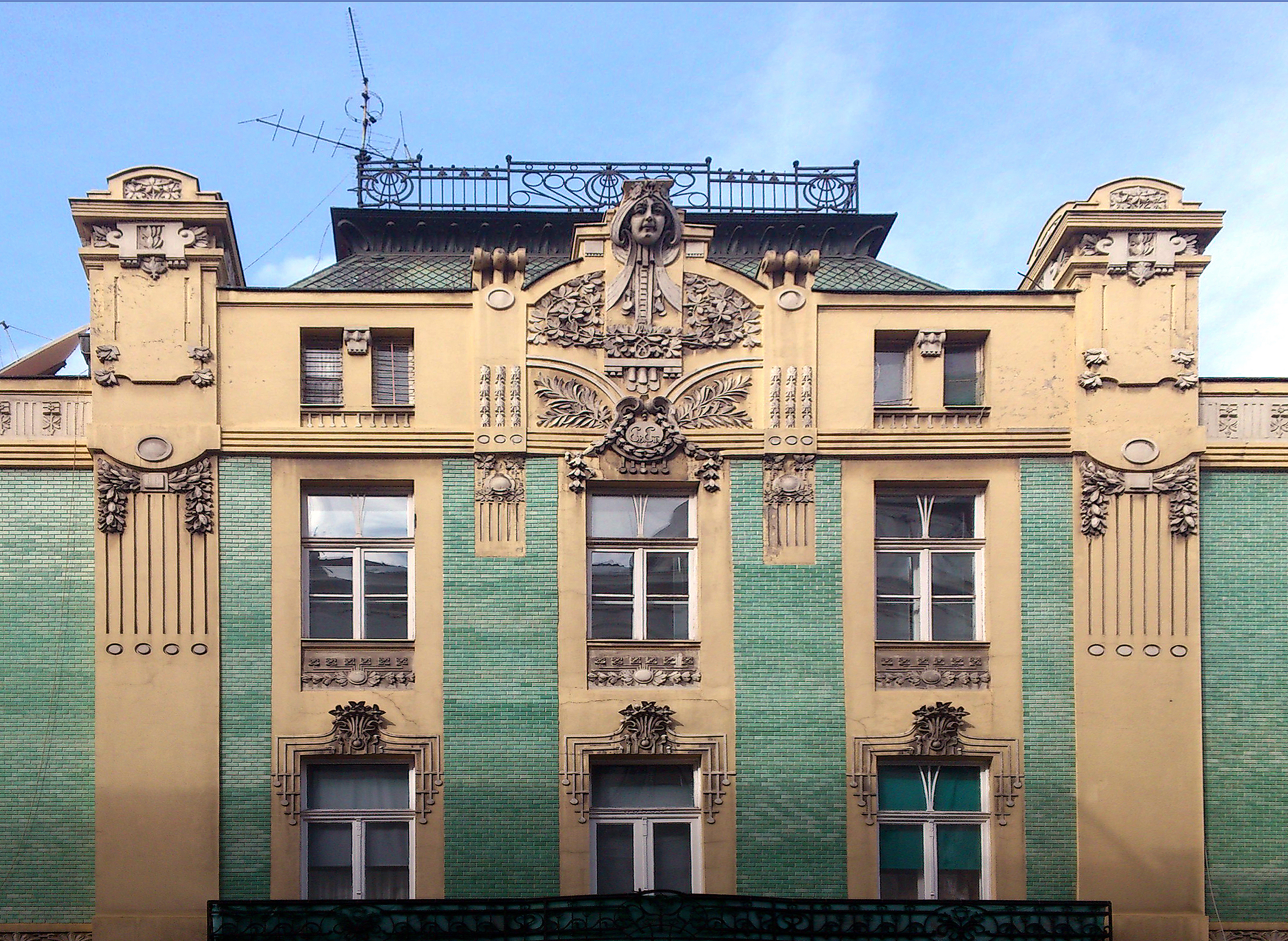
Facade

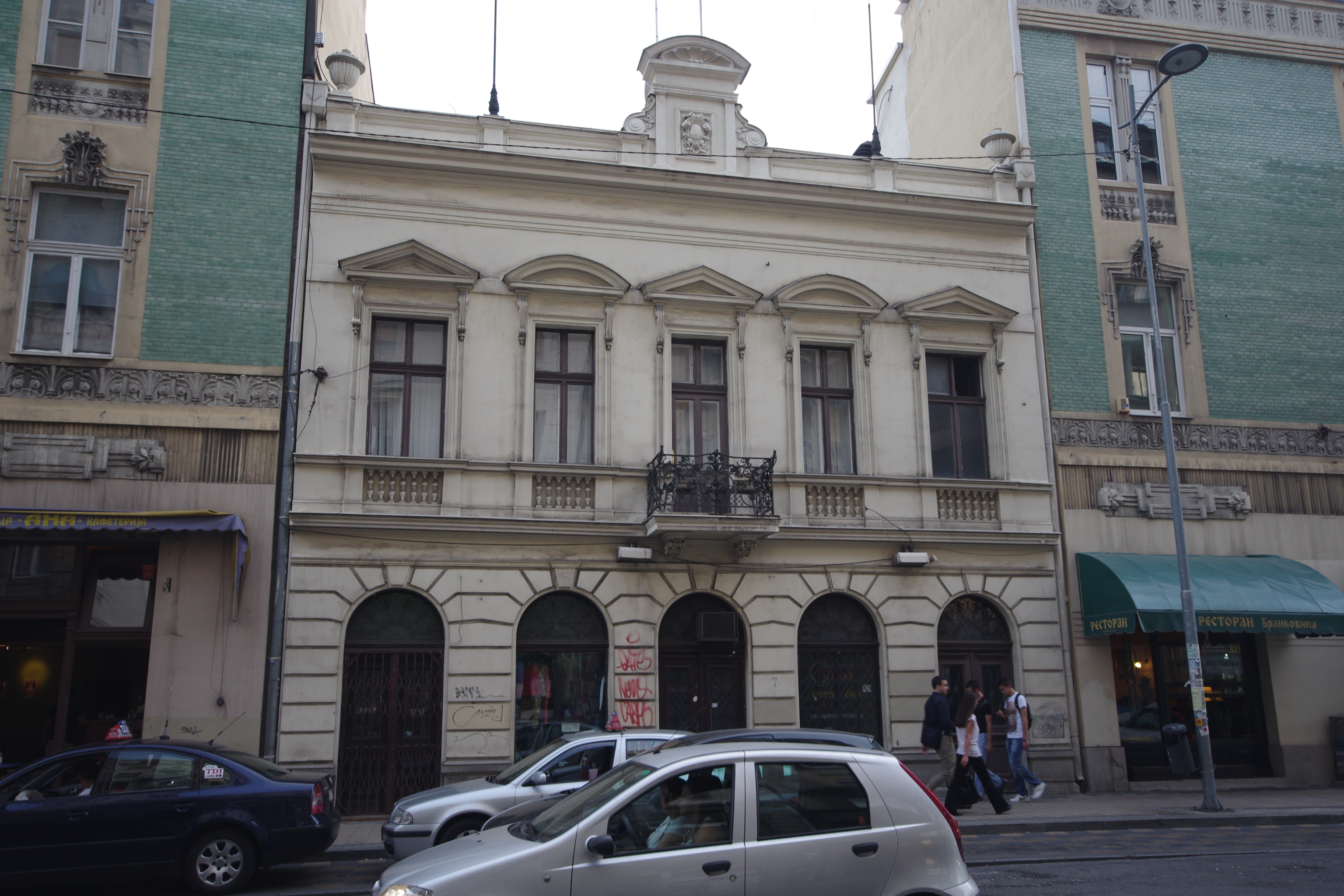

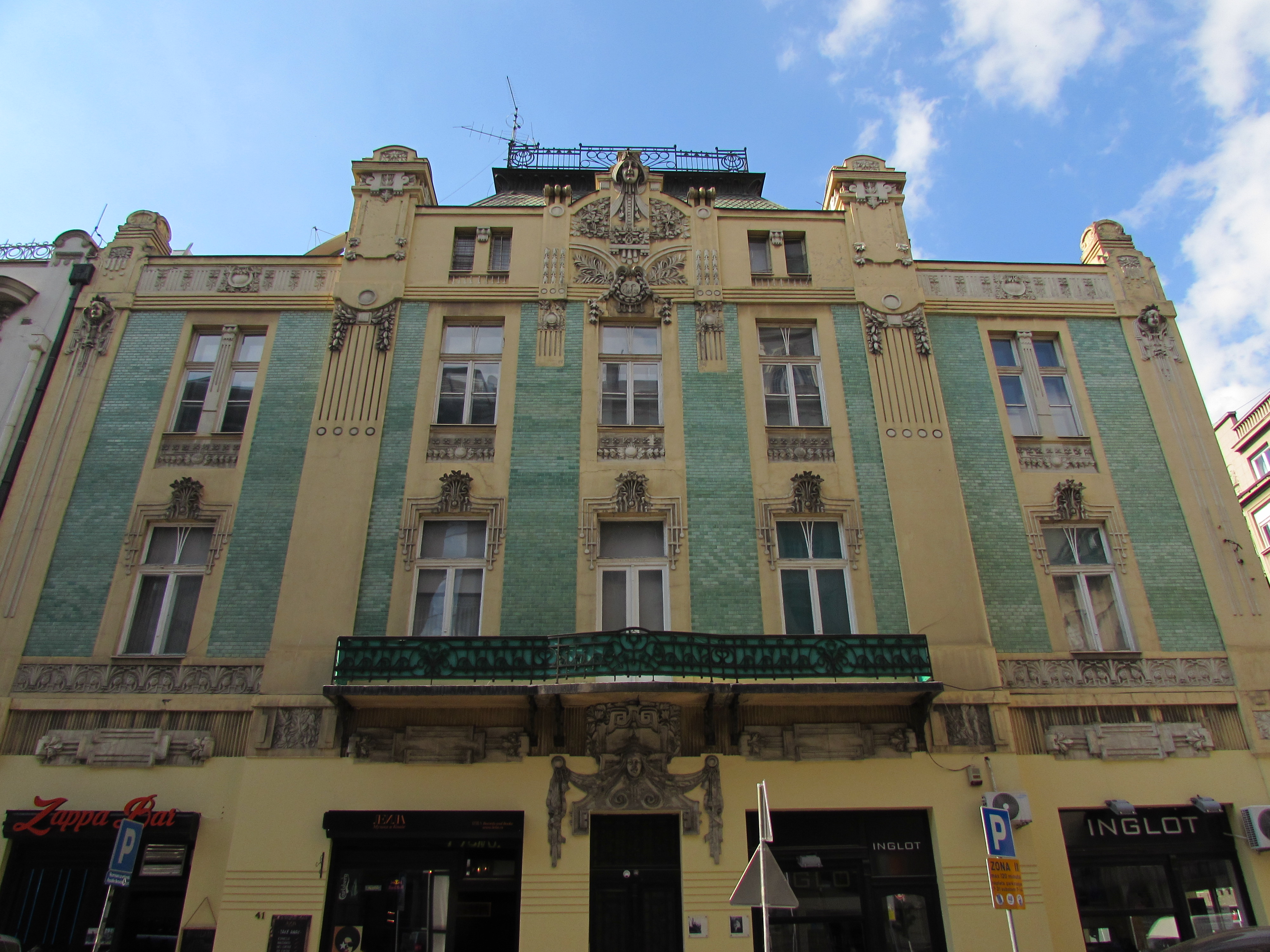

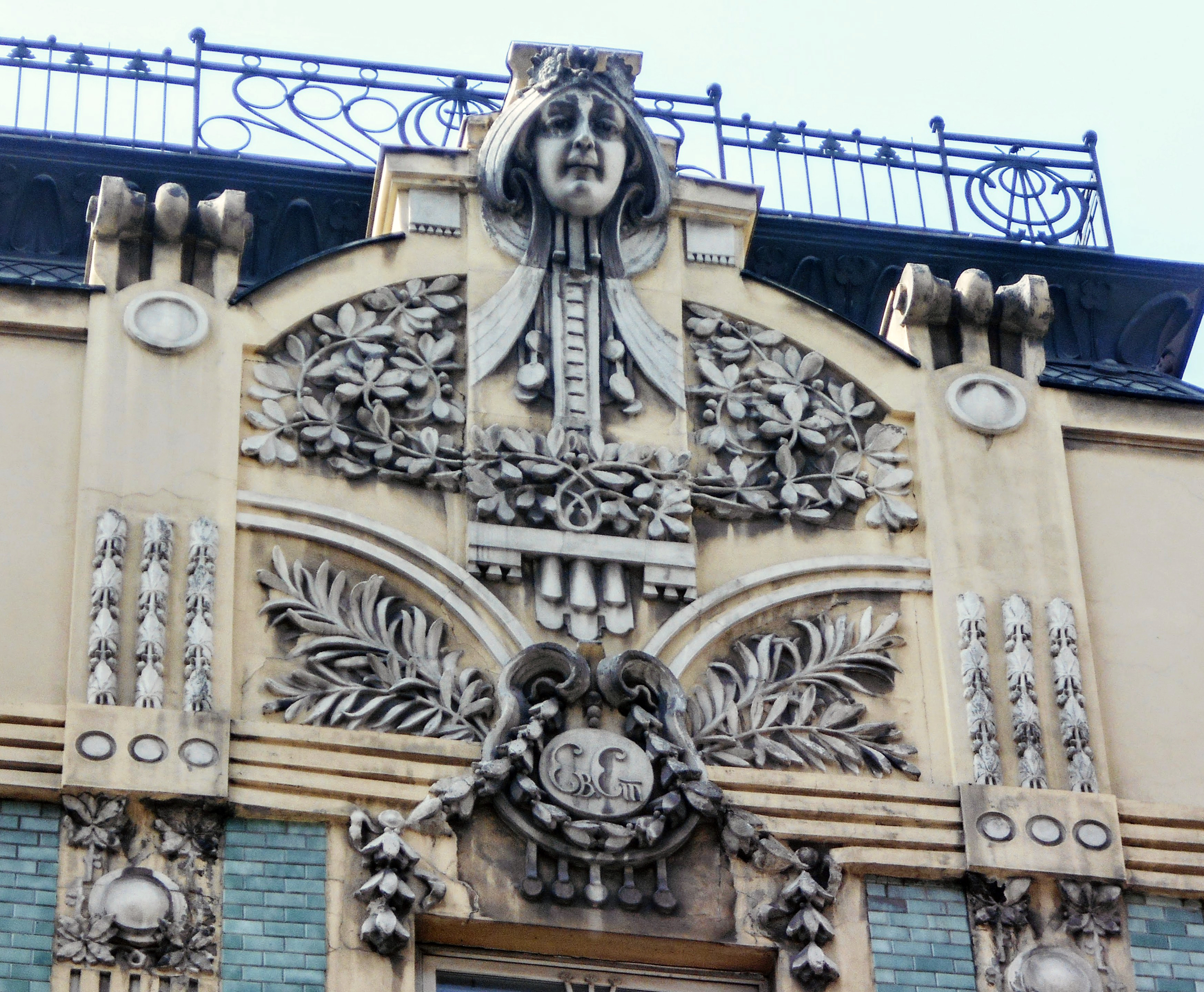
