= Andra Stevanović =

Serbian architect and professor

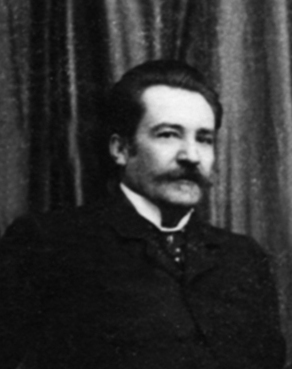
- Born: November 12, 1859; Belgrade, Principality of Serbia
- Died: November 15, 1929 (aged 70); Belgrade, Kingdom of Yugoslavia
- Education: Technische Universität Berlin
- Occupation: Architect

Andra Stevanović (Belgrade, 12 November 1859 - Belgrade, 15 November 1929) was a Serbian architect and professor at the University of Belgrade. Andra Stevanović and architect Nikola Nestorović collaborated on several major projects in Belgrade that are now considered cultural monuments.

== Biography ==
His father was Joca Stevanović, a civil servant. He finished elementary school and high school in Belgrade in 1877. In 1881, he graduated from the Technical Faculty of the Velika škola in Belgrade and immediately got a job in the civil service, where he spent two years working as a sub-engineer in the Belgrade district. Like most Serbian engineers of the time, he had to do his post-graduate studies abroad. In 1883, he began studying at the Berlin's Königlich Technische Hochschule Charlottenburg, where he remained for several years and acquired solid practical knowledge. He graduated and passed the state exam, which was a rarity for an alien in Germany, a privilege given to a small number of foreigners.

He returned to Serbia and got a job at the beginning of 1890 as an engineer in the Ministry of Construction, where he stayed for only three months. He was elected professor at the Technical Faculty of his alma mater in Belgrade, where he worked until his retirement in 1924. He was among the first eight full professors of the University of Belgrade in 1905, who elected the entire other teaching staff. They were Jovan Žujović, Sima Lozanić, Jovan Cvijić, Mihailo Petrović Alas, Andra Stevanović, Dragoljub Pavlović, Milić Radovanović and Ljubomir Jovanović. He thus achieved his life ideal, to which he remained faithful for the rest of his life. He turned down many more lucrative positions in the state apparatus and chose to work with students. During his life, he dedicated most of his energy to university work and education. He was a good expert and a good speaker. He supported the will of the students for the vocation they had chosen.

In addition to pedagogy, he was engaged in the design and study of old church monuments, Oplenac in particular. He was elected a member of the Serbian Royal Academy in 1910 and was the secretary of its Art Department for a long time. When he retired, he was awarded the title of Honorary Doctor of Science of the University of Belgrade. Andra Stevanović participated a lot in the public life of Belgrade and Serbia, which most likely prevented him from achieving greater results in the field of science and design. He died in Belgrade after returning from one of his study trips.

== Significant architectural works ==
- National Museum of Serbia with Nikola Nestorović;
- House V. Marković - Terazije 38 with Nikola Nestorović;
- Belgrade Cooperative - 48 Karadjordjeva Street with Nikola Nestorović;
- Building of Merchant Stamenković- Corner of King Peter and Uzun-Mirkova with Nikola Nestorović;
- Serbian Royal Academy (today the Serbian Academy of Arts and Sciences building) - Knez Mihajlova 35 with Nikola Nestorović and Dragutin Đorđević;
- Church of Saint Sava in Kosovska Mitrovica;
- The Serbian Orthodox Seminary building in Prizren.
