= Nestorović =

Nestorović (Serbian Cyrillic: Hecтopoвић) is a Serbian surname, a patronymic derived from the given name Nestor. It may refer to:

- Pavle Nestorović (fl. 1689), Habsburg Serb commander
- Nikola Nestorović (1868–1957), Serbian architect and professor
- Branimir Nestorović (born 1954), Serbian politician
- Darko Nestorović (born 1965), Bosnian Serb football manager
- Dušan Nestorović (born 1986), Montenegrin footballer
- Marko Nestorović (born 1984), Serbian football midfielder
- Teodor of Vršac, born Nestorović, Serbian Orthodox bishop
- Daniel Nestor, born Danijel Nestorović (1972), Canadian tennis player
