= SS Nestor =

A number of steamships were named Nestor, including –

- SS Nestor (1868), 282 GRT
- SS Nestor (1883), 122 GRT
- SS Nestor (1894), 1,096 GRT
- SS Nestor (1913), 14,629 GRT
- SS Nestor (1918), 1,959 GRT
- SS Nestor (1919), 153 GRT
- SS Nestor (1939), 2,446 GRT
