= Nestori Karhula =

Finnish-Australian Jaeger lieutenant (1893–1971)

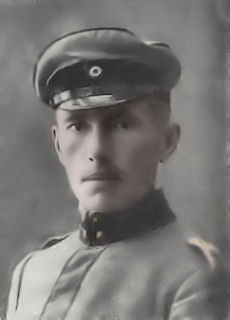
Karhula in 1918

Nestori Ilmari Karhula (9 November 1893 – 13 January 1971) was a Finnish-Australian farmer, who served as lieutenant of the Jäger Movement during the 1918 Finnish Civil War.

== Biography ==
=== Early life ===
Karhula was born in Lohtaja (today part of Kokkola) to farmer Tuomas Karhula (1869–1914) and Mariana Huhtala (1874–1941). Karhula graduated from the Finnish Co-educational School in Kokkola in 1913 and joined the Southern Ostrobothnia branch. He continued his studies at the Department of Agricultural Economics and Faculty of Philosophy at University of Helsinki in 1914–1915.

=== During the Civil War ===
Karhula returned to Finland on the second expedition of the gunship SS Equity to Merikarvia in Aspuskäri on 8 December 1917. After landing, he joined the White Army and took part in the preparations for the civil war by training members of the protection corps in the Oulu area. He also led the transport of weapons from Kokkola to Oulu in January 1918. After the outbreak of hostilities, he led the capture of Kokkola at the Ventus elementary school. The group he led was assembled from the protection corps of Kaustinen, Veteli, Nedervetil, Terjärv and Kokkola, as well as the Kokkola rural parish. After the capture of Kokkola, he formed the so-called Kokkola flying corps from his troops who had thus gained front-line experience, which he further trained as front-line troops. These Kokkola flying corps then moved to Oulu, where the group participated in the capture of Oulu. When the Jaeger troops were established, Karhula was transferred as a platoon leader to the 7th Jaeger Battalion, from where he was further transferred to the machine gun company of the 2nd Jaeger Regiment on 12 April 1918, from where he was assigned as a company commander to the machine gun company of the 4th Jaeger Battalion on 20 April 1918. He took part in the Battle of Tampere, Tarpila and Raivola.

=== After the Civil War ===
After the Civil War, Karhula continued to serve as a machine gun company commander in the 2nd Jaeger Regiment, which later became the 2nd Jaeger Regiment and later the 2nd Pori Infantry Regiment. He resigned from the army on 2 September 1918 and transferred to the service of the Finnish Guards Corps. He was assigned as a local commander to the Lohtaja and Kokkola Guards Corps, and then on 1 May 1919 as a local commander to the Central Ostrobothnia Guards Corps District, and again on 10 February 1921 as a local commander to the Lohtaja Guards Corps. In 1920, Karhula was married to Kerttu Wägg (1899–1984).

=== Moving to Australia ===
In 1921, Karhula emigrated from Lohtaja to Australia, where he worked as a farmer in Queensland. In addition to his work as a farmer, he worked as a justice of the peace in Queensland, which he lost because he was interned in a prisoner of war camp after Australia declared war against Finland. He was in the prison camp from 1942 to 1943, after which his former rights and status were restored. From 1951, Karhula worked as an immigration agent in Australia.

Karhula helped found the first Finnish newspaper Suomi published in Australia in 1925. He was interested in collecting information about old Finns in Australia and New Zealand and founded the Cairns Finnish Society in 1923. He also founded the Suomi Athletic Club in Brisbane in 1927. Karhula also served as secretary of the Eight Mile Plains Primary School Committee in 1927–1928 and the Mt. Gravatt Primary School Committee in 1929–1931, and as secretary of the Runcorn Progress Society in 1929–1932. Karhula also served in Australia as a member of the local anti-aircraft department and as chairman of the Finnish Relief Committee.

Karhula died in 1971 and was buried in Brisbane.

== Sources ==
=== Further reading ===
- Puolustusministeriön Sotahistoriallisen toimiston julkaisuja. Suomen jääkärien elämäkerrasto (in Finnish). Vol. IV. Porvoo: WSOY. 1938.
- Sotatieteen Laitoksen Julkaisuja. Suomen jääkärien elämäkerrasto 1975 (in Finnish). Vol. XIV. Vaasa. 1975. ISBN 951-99046-8-9.
