= Belgrade Cooperative Bank =

Former co-operative bank building

Belgrade Cooperative building
- Београдска задруга
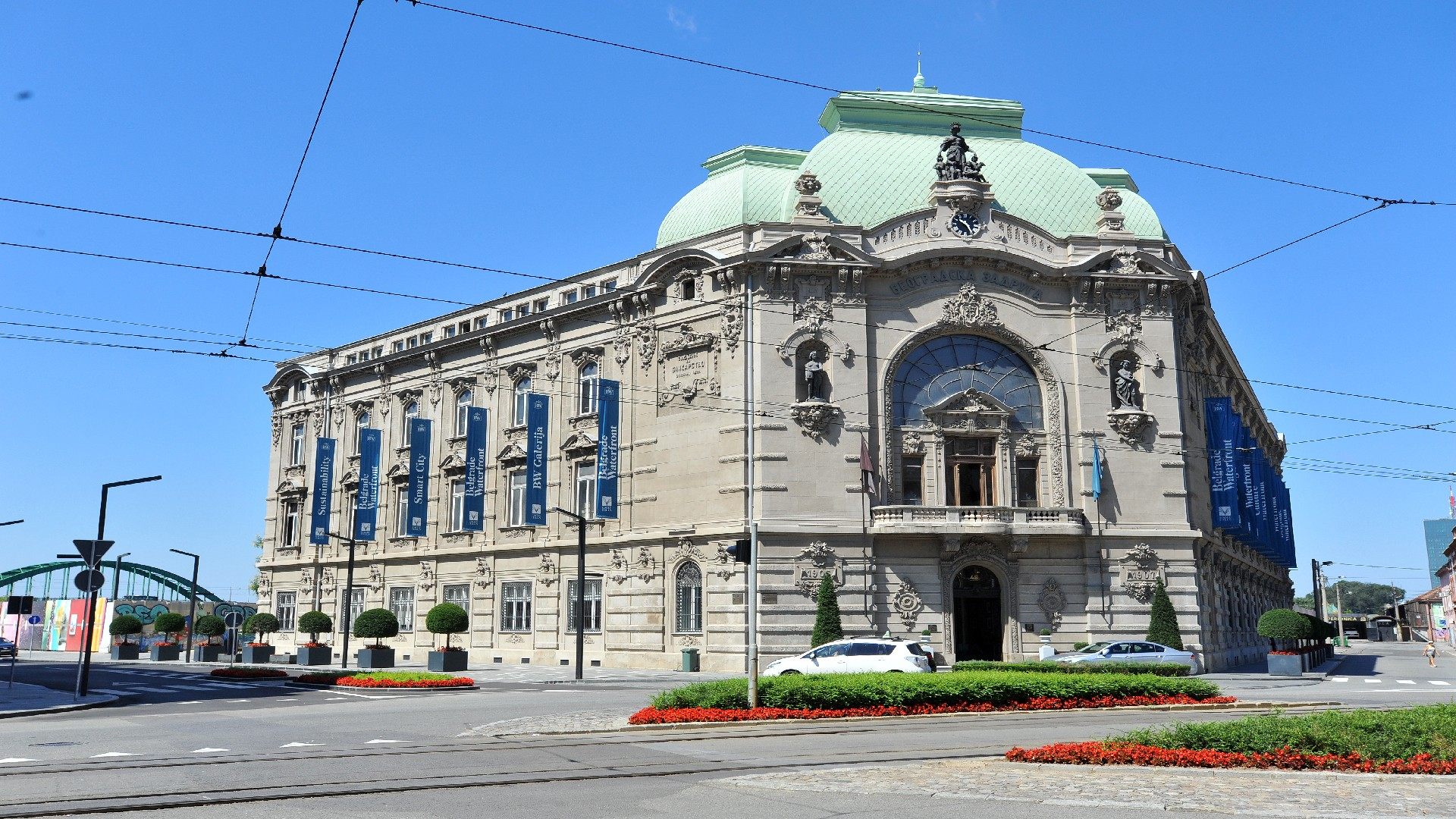
- View from outside

- Location within Belgrade

General information
- Location: Karađorđeva 48, Belgrade, Serbia
- Coordinates: 44°48′47.9″N 20°27′07.3″E
- Opened: 1907

Belgrade Cooperative (Serbian: Београдска задруга, romanized: Beogradska zadruga) was a Serbian cooperative bank founded in 1882 to promote savings and support small enterprises, craftspeople and the poor of Belgrade. Member-shareholders have been paying membership in amount of one Serbian Dinar per week. That was the way for cooperative to become a public savings bank. Luka Ćelović was the first president of cooperative, also a first Serbian insurance group.

The cooperative was notable for the building it built on Karađorđeva Street in Belgrade in 1907 and used as its headquarters until the cooperative was closed in 1944. The Palace of the Belgrade Cooperative was designated as a cultural monument since 1966 and was declared a cultural asset of great importance by the Serbian government in 1979.

== History ==
The construction of Belgrade Cooperative coincided with the change of political regime in Serbia. After the assassination of the king Aleksandar Obrenović, the Karadjordjevic dynasty came to power, which led to a change in the system of governance. Autocratic regime was replaced by liberal bourgeois regime of Petar the I, the civil liberties were increased and the economic situation was improved.

"Belgrade cooperative for mutual help and savings" was founded in 1882 at the initiative of a group of Belgrade merchants, with the idea of investing into Serbia economy. This type of investment was a modern form of credit and an advanced method for reviving both the trading business and the market within the capitalist economy. Since 1897, when the Department of Insurance was founded, in addition to the cooperative banking activity, Belgrade Cooperative was increasingly developed as an insurance company. From being the savings fund and loaning money to the small proprietors, the Cooperative developed into the strong financial organization which loaned money to the city and state. Branches were open in Skopje and Thessaloniki.

As such, it operated until 1944, representing one of the most important institutions of its kind. Some of the most important figures of economic and financial life of Serbia were once acting as a president of Belgrade Cooperative - its organizer and principal job coordinator, Luka Ćelović, subsequent donor and benefactor of Belgrade University, Kosta Taušanović and Lazar Paču, the financial leaders of Serbia of their time, public figures, prominent politicians and statesmen, as well as other well-known Belgrade businessmen, Đorđe Vajfert, Dimitirije Ćirković and others.

At the regular shareholders meeting in 1897, it was decided that a new building will be erected and so multiple properties were bought belonging to Krsmanović brothers, Gođevac brothers, Municipality of Belgrade, Vuja Ranković and Luka Ćelović, in close vicinity to the so-called Little Market on the Sava River. The construction began in the spring of 1905 and was completed in 1907, in the record time for that period.

Belgrade cooperative moved into the new building immediately after the completion of construction in 1907 and remained there until its abolition. The building was later used by the Geological Geophysical Institute "Jovan Žujović".

== Characteristics ==
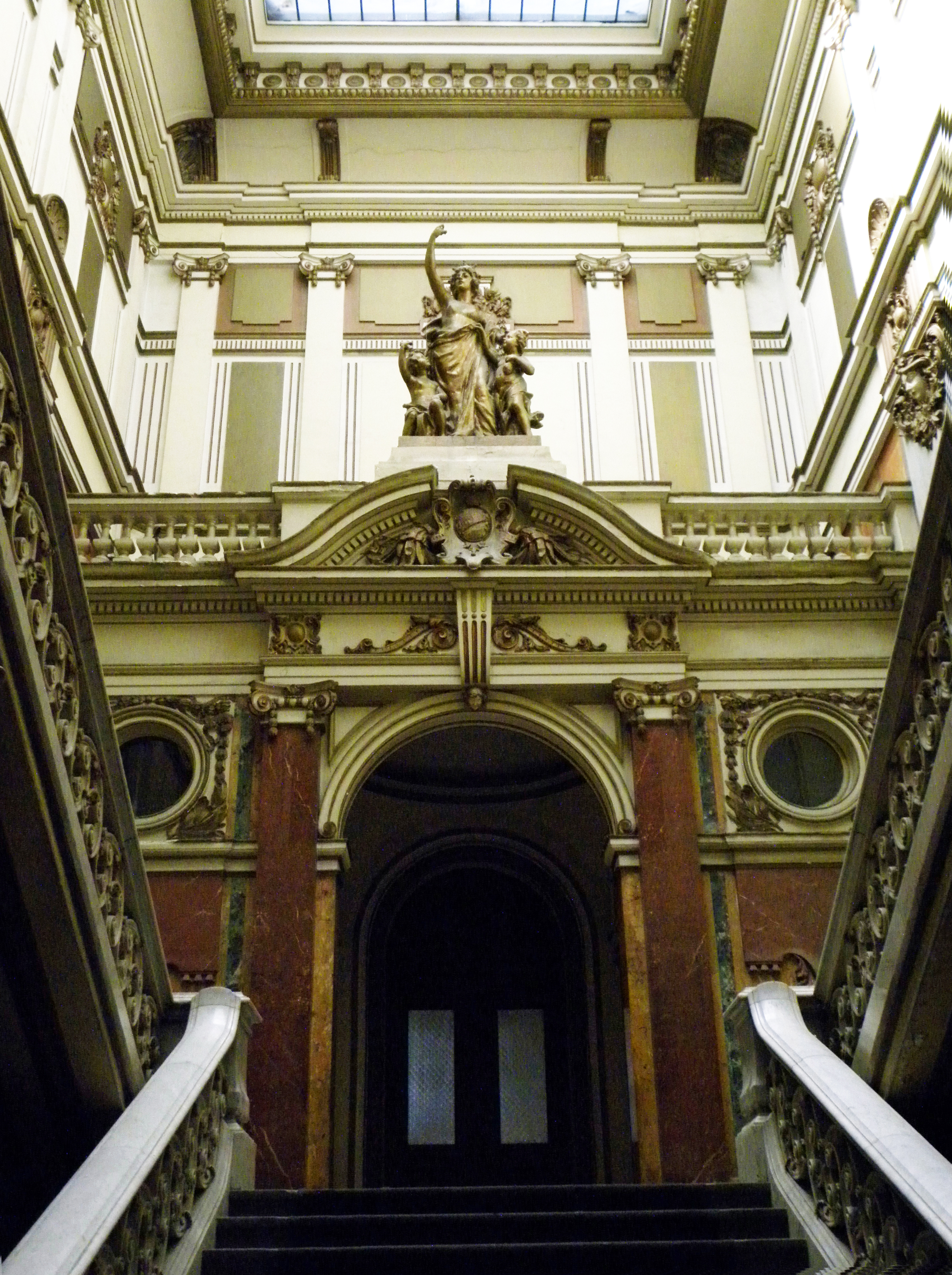
Interior of the building

The total floor area covers 5,000 m^{2} (54,000 sq ft).

Belgrade Cooperative Building was built according to the project by two leading Belgrade architects, University professors, Andra Stevanović and Nikola Nestorović. The majority of the building was constructed on the old embankment, and since the land was underwater due to the proximity of the river, the foundation of many walls has to be made of reinforced concrete, the first time in Belgrade, but using the iron for clamps, since there were was no round iron in Belgrade at the time.

The contractors of construction works were brothers Stok. All cut stone materials were made by the "Industry of Ripanj granite." Decorations on the facades and interior, with rich decorative plastic in stucco on the walls and on the ceiling, are work of Franja Valdman, the sculptor of building ornaments.

Decorative paintings in the main entrance are work of Bora Kovačević and Andrea Domenico, while the paintings on glass were made by R. Marković.

The social status of the Belgrade Cooperative dictated that the representativeness and monumentality become the only possible architectural concept.

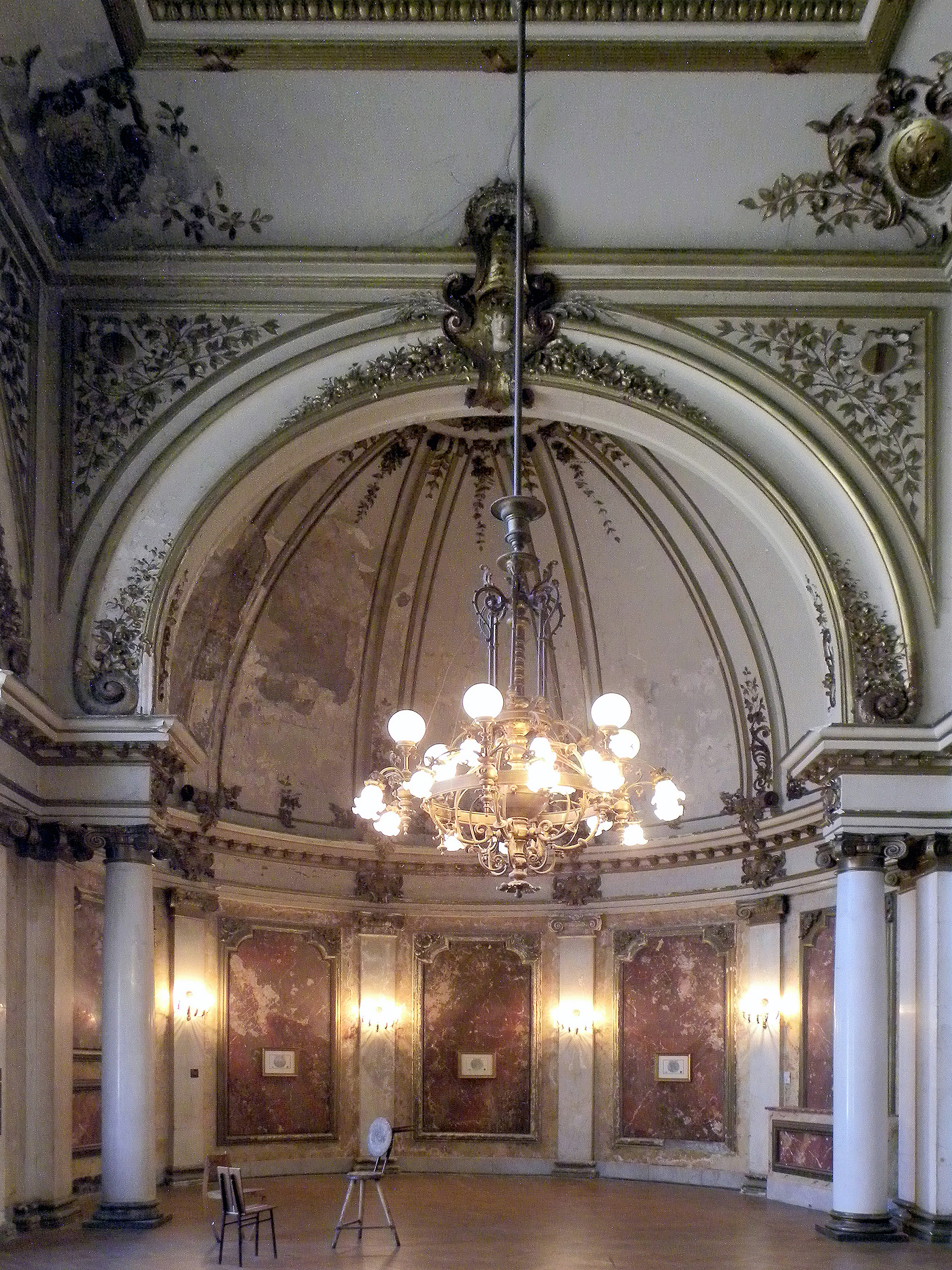
Ceremonial hall

It was designed in the style of academism, with elements borrowed from both eclectic academic style, as well as contemporary Art Nouveau architecture. It was built as a monumental corner building with three wings in the floor plan at the irregular plot. The most representative part of the building is the prominent and jagged central part, where the public rooms are located, with the main facade in Karadjordjeva Street. The wings in Travnička and Hercegovačka Streets in which the workrooms are located have simple facades with uniform peaceful rhythm and different composition in every elevation. The central wing facing the street has two floors – the entrance and the ceremonial hall with the vestibule that extends through two floors and one storey Counter hall in the rear, while both side wings have a ground floor and two floors. Shops were once located on the ground floor of the side wings while the administrative and management offices were on the first floor.

The Belgrade Cooperative building was built using mixed techniques. Cellars, which extend beneath the entire building, are made of reinforced concrete, with Prussian vaults. Most of the building was built using a standard procedure, brick in lime mortar, and only partly in reinforced concrete. Bridging is architrave for the side wings, and the architrave and arch in the middle wing. Lantern construction above the central staircase is resolved in the form of triangular metal grille. Roofs have jamb walls, small slope and domes. Façade which is facing the street is made in stone slabs in socle zone and dressed in artificial stone, while the courtyard façade is plastered.

Structural system has vaults and marble columns. Main staircases are three-armed, stone or marble, while side staircases are spiral and iron. The interior walls are plastered and painted, while the representative rooms are decorated with wall paintings and marble imitation and have pilasters with gilded capitals and applied polychrome decorative female masks. The floors have parquet or terrazzo tiles. On the facades decoration was made of artificial stone, while the interior is in stucco and plaster.

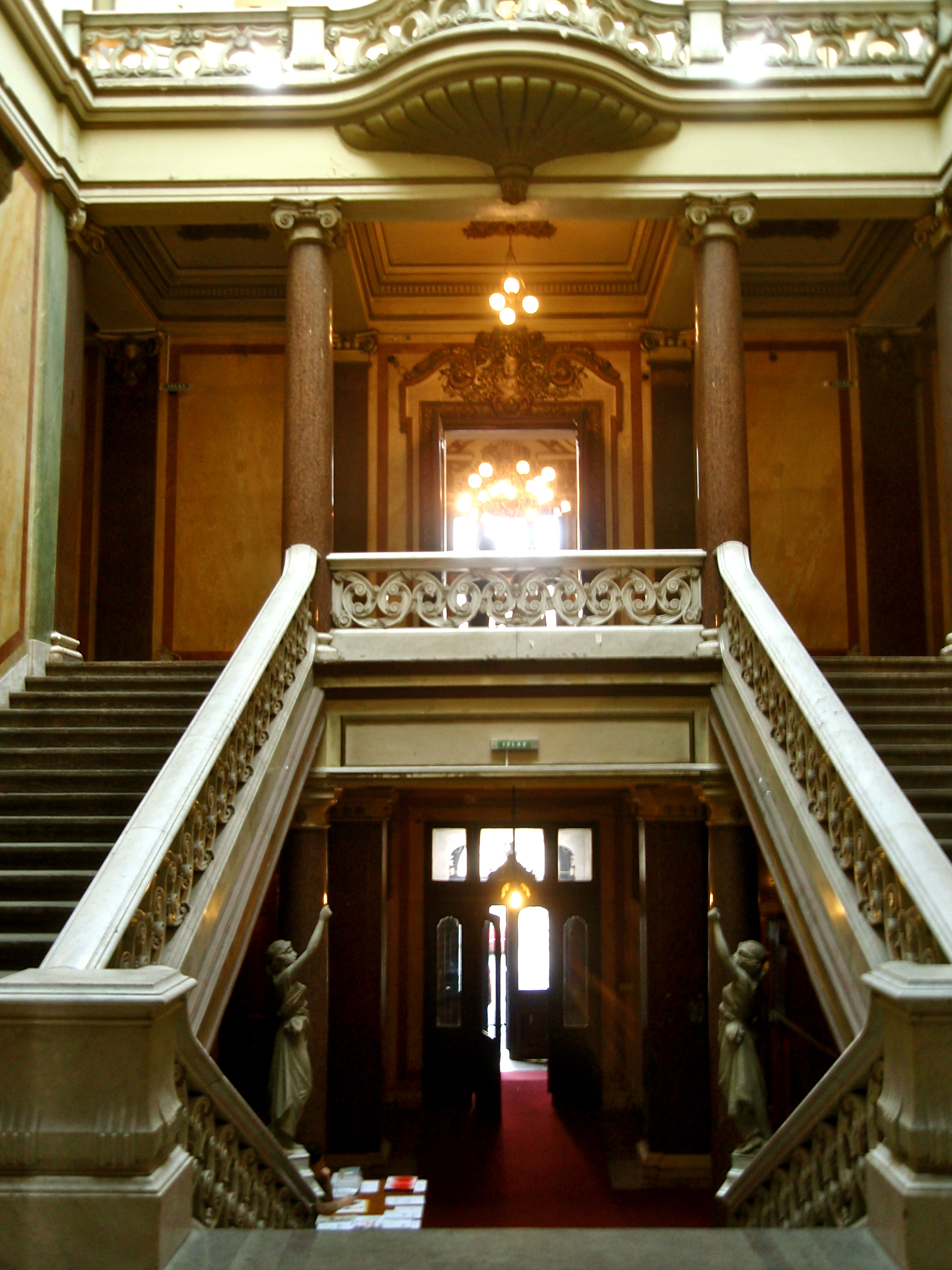
Interior of the building

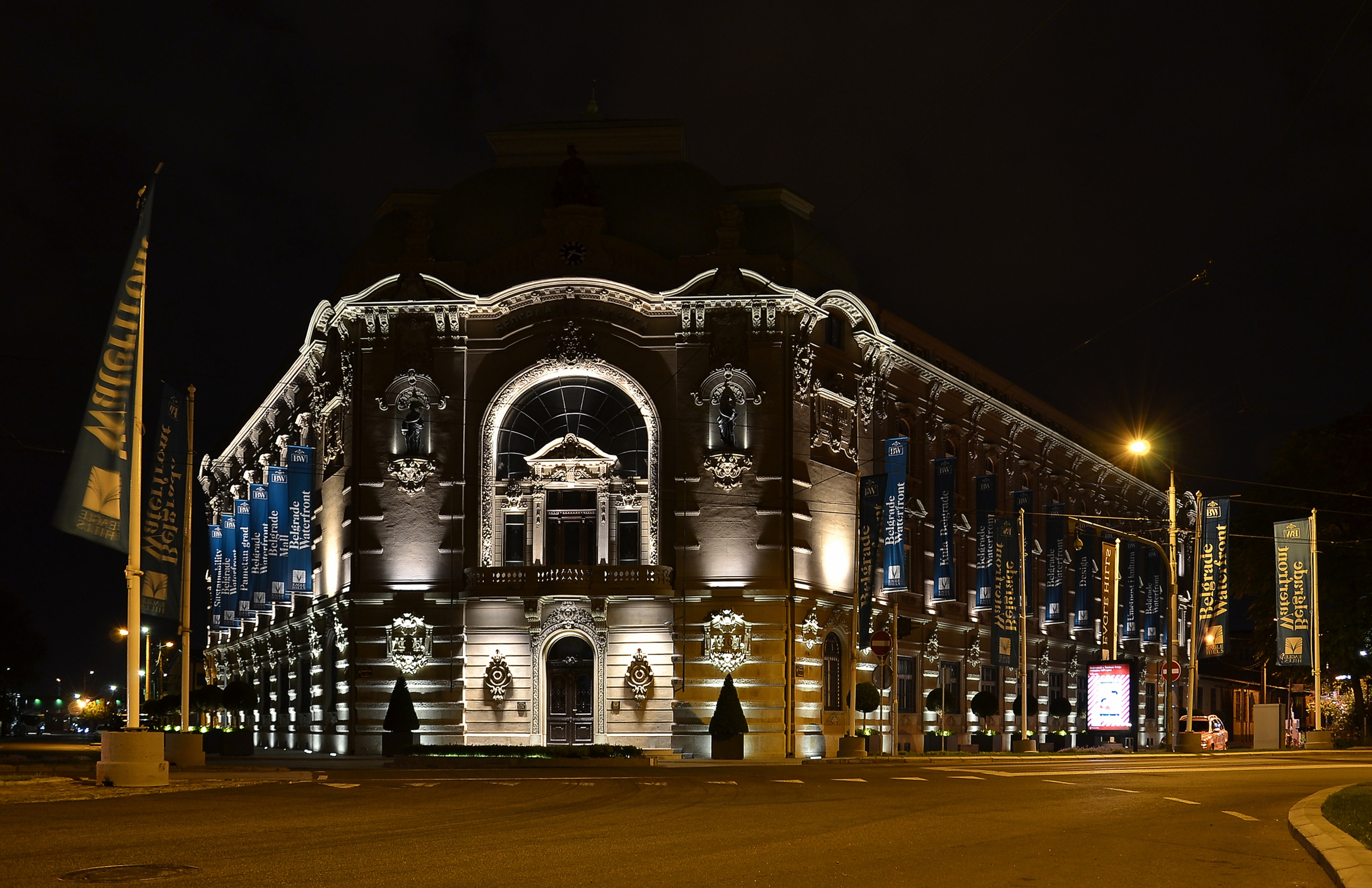
Building by night, after the reconstruction

All the decorative motifs of Belgrade Cooperative Building are borrowed from post Renaissance, predominantly Baroque, but modernly interpreted to form the unique style expression. Frontal facade is dominated by the large glass surface above which is a dome with merlon flanked by sculptural group consisting of a female figure, the personification of Serbia and four children's figures that embody the Industry. In the niches on the side projections of the main façade are the figures of a Woman with beehive and a Man with a scroll. Inside the building in the main hall, at the beginning of the staircase there are two counterpart figures of a young woman in the form of a chandelier. Above the gallery in the main hall there is a sculptural group consisting of a female figure with a crown, again a symbol of Serbia and two children figures representing the insurance and banking. Metal figure, probably an import, is gilded, as well as all stucco decoration. On the top of pilaster strips, above the windows of the first floor and in the amount of ground-floor windows on the side walls there is a number of reliefs in the form of female masks, while the mask of Mercury is positioned above the entrance. The unity of architecture and applied decorative arts in the interior of the Belgrade Cooperative building is clearly visible. That kind of unity is particularly valued in European architecture from the late 19th and early 20th century and is known as the "synthesis of art". This "synthesis of art" is extremely rare in Belgrade architecture and it makes Belgrade Cooperative building a unique creation. Each of the decorative elements, such as the paintings on the walls and ceilings, sculptures, stucco decorations, chandeliers and appliqué on the walls, painted glass parapet at the Counter-hall or glass surfaces of windows and doors of the main hall, are distinctive features which is why Belgrade Cooperative became a cultural monument in 1966.

The building is often named as one of the most beautiful buildings in Belgrade.

== Reconstructions ==
Belgrade Cooperative Building was renovated several times. The most important changes in the construction and architectural structure were made in 1956/57 and 1958/59. During those years, the Geological Geophysical Institute made a decision to extend the building by adding the third floor above both wings in Travnička and Hercegovačka streets, and then three floors above the central wing in the yard around the former Counter hall. These extensions altered the general appearance of the building by removing the wing's domes, the attic became floor, windows and doors in the ground floor were walled up and shop doors become windows of offices. Merlon was removed from the central dome as well as the clock from the main façade. The Counter-hall inside the block remained on the ground floor and it was lit through light well.

Belgrade Cooperative is one of the most significant buildings in Belgrade and Serbian architecture in the first decade of the 20th century and one of the most successful achievements of architects Andra Stevanović and Nikola Nestorović. Architectural concept, compliance of building's functional and compositional elements, rich sculptural and decorative plastics, style consistency, construction quality, new construction methods used for the first time, new materials and other architectural features put this building among the most representative palaces in Belgrade architecture. Belgrade Cooperative building is one of the few buildings that represent the beginning of the modern reconstruction of Belgrade along the Sava embankment. Belgrade Cooperative Building is a cultural monument of value for the Republic of Serbia since 1979 (Decision, "Službeni glasnik SRS" no. 14/79).

City's Institute for the protection of the cultural monuments drafted the reconstruction project for the building in 2009. Authored by Aleksandra Šević and Ljiljana Konta, the project was to include the complete rebuilding of the, today non-existing, two side domes. They were to be built of wood and steel and look the same as the small domes on the head façade. Deteriorated sculpture on the front dome was to be removed and replaced by the new one, made of metal. A mast, which once stood on the central dome, will also be rebuilt and also serve as the lightning rod. Due to the lack of funds, the project didn't go on.

== Present ==
As the building is within the location of the Belgrade Waterfront project, the investors of this project renovated the venue in 2014. Reconstruction included refurbishment of the object as it is, without reconstruction of the missing parts. Despite the already existing controversy surrounding the project (68% of which is owned by the investors from the United Arab Emirates), after the government officials reopened the building in the summer of 2014, in September the government ceded the building to the investor for further use. The use was rent-free for the first two years.

Government initially stated that the building will be open to everyone and that renovation cost more than €2 million, which was "donation from the UAE". There is no published paperwork which confirms financial dealings surrounding the reconstruction, and the government bodies either refused to comment or stated they don't have any papers since it was a direct donation. The ground floor was adapted into the info center for the Belgrade Waterfront project, while the visitors were able to visit upstairs, but only to walk the corridors as the luxurious restaurant was opened on the upper floor.

The restaurant, which changed names and is now named "Salon 1905" and operated by the 05 Co d.o.o. company, is not opened by the Belgrade Warefront company, yet sub-leasing of the object is illegal per leasing contract. Bills issued by the restaurant doesn't show the turnover is happening on this address, but on 05 Co d.o.o. address in another part of town, which is also illegal. Ad hoc opening of a restaurant in the building under the highest legal protection is illegal, too. The restaurant's owners claim everything is legal, but didn't provide any paperwork. The state not only refused to investigate or intervene, but government officials organized official state dinners in the venue.

== See also ==
- List of banks in Yugoslavia

== Literature ==
- S. Rajić, Aleksandar Obrenović/vladar na prelazu vekova, sukobljeni svetovi, Srpska književna zadruga, Beograd 2011.
- N. Nеstоrоvić, Grаđеvinе i аrhitеkti u Bеоgrаdu prоšlоg stоlеćа, Bеоgrаd 1937, 76
- Z. Manević, Pioniri moderne arhitekture Beograda, Urbаnizam Beograda 16 (1962)
- G. Gоrdić, Аrhitеktоnskо naslеđе grаdа Beograda, 64
- Ј. Sеkulić, Ž. Škаlаmеrа, Аrhitеktоnskо naslеđе Beograda, II, Bеоgrаd 1966, 31;
- Z. Manević, Srpskа аrhitеkturа 1900–1970, Bеоgrаd 1970
- B. Nеstоrоvić, Bеоgrаdski аrhitеkti Аndrа Stеvаnоvić i Nikоlа Nеstоrоvić, Gоdišnjаk grаdа Beograda XXIII (1975)
- D. Đurić- Zаmоlо, Grаditеlјi Beograda, 2009
- B. Vuјоvić, Bеоgrаd u prоšlоsti i sаdаšnjоsti
- V.Pаvlоvić-Lоnčаrski, Маli piјаc na Sаvi krајеm XIX i pоčеtkоm XX vеkа, Naslеđе br. VI, 2005
- Dоsiје о prоglаšеnju Bеоgrаdskе zadrugе za spоmеnik kulturе, Dоkumеntаciја Zаvоdа za zaštitu spоmеnikа kulturе grаdа Beograda.
