= John Nestor =

American government official

- Born: John Oliver Nestor; November 7, 1912; Franklin, New Jersey, United States
- Died: May 1, 1999 (aged 86); Northern Virginia, United States
- Occupations: Physician, government medical officer
- Employer: U.S. Food and Drug Administration
- Known for: Whistleblower; driving habits
- Military career
- Branch: United States Navy
- Conflicts: World War II
- Awards: Bronze Star for Valor

John Oliver Nestor (November 7, 1912 – May 1, 1999) was a U.S. Food and Drug Administration medical officer and whistleblower.

== Early life ==
Nestor was born in Franklin, New Jersey, and had nine siblings. He graduated from Georgetown University medical school in 1940. During World War II, he served in the United States Air Force as a flight surgeon and was awarded a Bronze Star for valor for his actions in Corsica in 1944. Specifically, during a bombing and strafing raid, left his trench's safety to provide first aid to the wounded and help ensure their evacuation.

== Career ==
After the war, Nestor served as chief resident at Children's Hospital. While in private practice, he taught pediatrics at Georgetown and Howard University medical schools, as well as consulting with hospitals and government agencies. In 1961, Nestor joined the FDA.

During his employment at the FDA, Nestor revealed to the public that FDA leaders pressured reviewers, demanding new drugs be approved without adequate testing. He testified to Congress about the influence of pharmaceutical companies at the FDA and about FDA officials allowing drugs to stay on the market even after serious side effects had been identified. Despite receiving commendations from the Justice Department for uncovering fraudulent lab reports, Nestor was transferred from drug review duties by the FDA. Nestor fought the transfer and eventually resumed reviewing drugs.

On March 19, 1972, the FDA reassigned Nestor to its Office of Compliance, as part of a reorganization in which Civil Service doctors were replaced as drug approvers by consultants who were often affiliated with commercial companies. Nestor began a grievance proceeding. A review panel determined that senior FDA officials gave "misleading" testimony against Nestor and concluded that Nestor was due an apology and appropriate duties. In 1977, the FDA commissioner restored Nestor to the position he held before the 1972 transfer.

Robert G. Vaughn wrote in his book "The Successes and Failures of Whistleblower Laws" that Nestor "became one of the best-known FDA whistleblowers of all time."

== Driving practices ==
Nestor also achieved fame in the Washington, D.C. area in 1984 after The Washington Post published his letter describing his favored driving method: On highways Nestor would settle his vehicle in the far left lane and set the cruise control at the speed limit, at the time 55 mph. He would not move to the right for drivers behind him. "Why," he asked, "should I inconvenience myself for someone who wants to speed?" Nestor also believed he was performing a public service by forcing people to obey the nationwide 55 mile-per-hour speed limit. Nestor's letter enraged many motorists and led Paul J. Leonard to coin the term 'Nestoring' to describe the practice in another letter to the editor.

== Death ==
Nestor died of renal failure in 1999 at the age of 86 at the Hospice of Northern Virginia; he had lived in Virginia for 50 years.
