= Nikola Nestorović =

- Born: 15 April 1868; Požarevac, Principality of Serbia
- Died: 18 February 1957 (aged 88); Belgrade, SFRJ
- Education: Technische Universität Berlin
- Occupation: Architect

Nikola Nestorović (Serbian Cyrillic: Никола Несторовић, 15 April 1868 Požarevac - 18 February 1957, Belgrade) was a Serbian architect and professor at the Technical Faculty. He is one of the most important architects in Serbia, whose creativity marked and enriched Belgrade and Serbian architecture during the last decade of the nineteenth and the first decade of the twentieth century.

After finishing grade school, he moved to Belgrade, where he enrolled in the Technical College of the Great School. He graduated in 1890, and was employed as a subcontractor at the Ministry of Construction. He was sent to work in Požarevac, where he performed tasks on marking forests and regulating the flow of the Morava River. He returned to Belgrade in 1893, with a request for a scholarship to study architecture abroad. He didn't get a scholarship, but he got a paid leave and used that period to go to the Technische Hochschule in Charlottenburg (now Technische Universität Berlin). He finished his studies in 1896 and passed the state exam a year later. He returned to Belgrade and worked in the Ministry of Construction until 1905. As early as 1898, he became a part-time professor at the Technical Faculty. He was elected a permanent associate professor in 1905 and a full professor in 1919. After his retirement, he remained at the Faculty as a part-time teacher until the Second World War.

To this day, it is known that he designed sixty-eight buildings, mainly for public, business and residential purposes, while in the domain of sacred architecture he tried his hand at two projects. The creative activity of three decades and great productivity enabled a comprehensive overview, not only of the designer's oeuvre, but also of the Serbian architecture of that period and some of its most significant examples, of which Nestorović is the author. Educated in the spirit of academicism, and modern in his understandings, throughout his creative work he moved between academic postulates and modern secession aspirations, under the influence of the environment in which he created. At the beginning of his career, the canons of academicism served him as a safe and proven support, so that through collaboration with another famous Serbian architect Andra Stevanović, he achieved greater security and freedom in a more individual artistic expression.

His father was a merchant and president of the Požarevac municipality, and his son was an architect, Bogdan Nestorović.

== Significant works ==
- National Museum of Serbia with Andra Stevanovic
- House of N. Nestorovic - Kneza Milosa 40
- House of V. Markovic - Terazije 38, with Andra Stevanovic
- Belgrade Cooperative - Karadjordjeva 48 with Andra Stevanovic
- Building of Merchant Stamenković corner of Kralja Petra and Uzun-Mirkova with Andra Stevanovic
- Hotel Bristol, Belgrade corner of Karadjordjeva and Hercegovacka

== Gallery ==
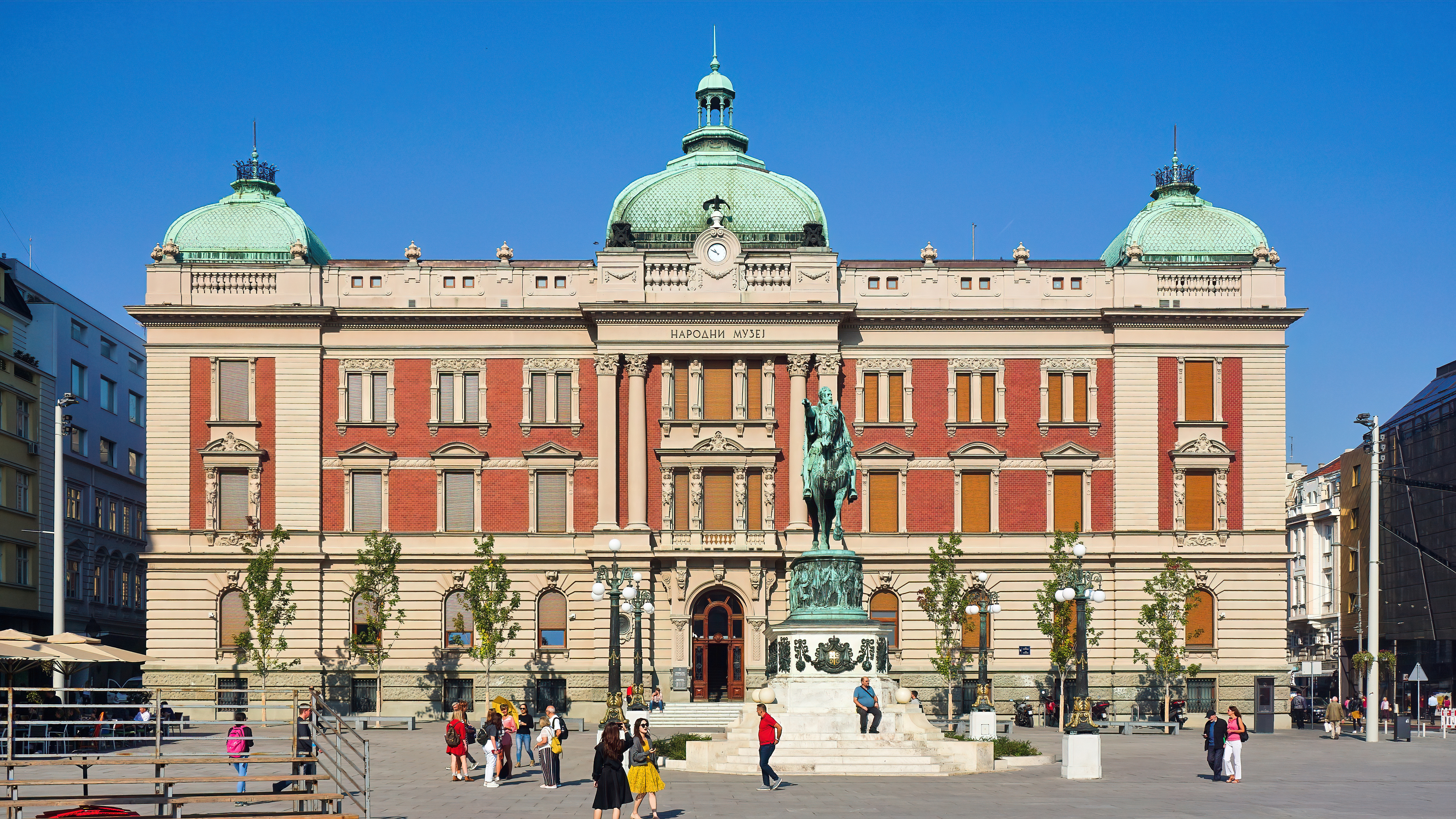
National Museum

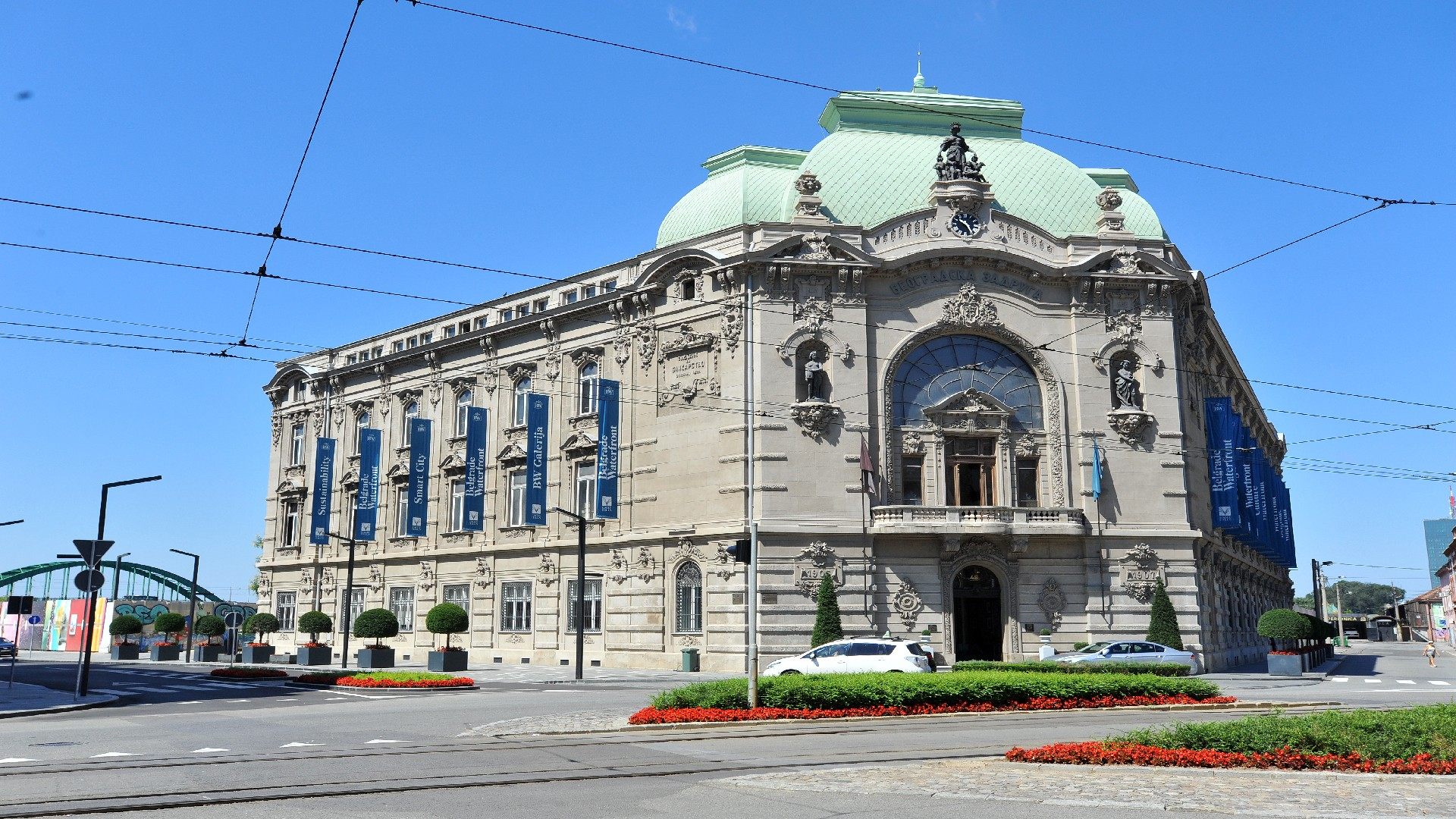
Belgrade Cooperative

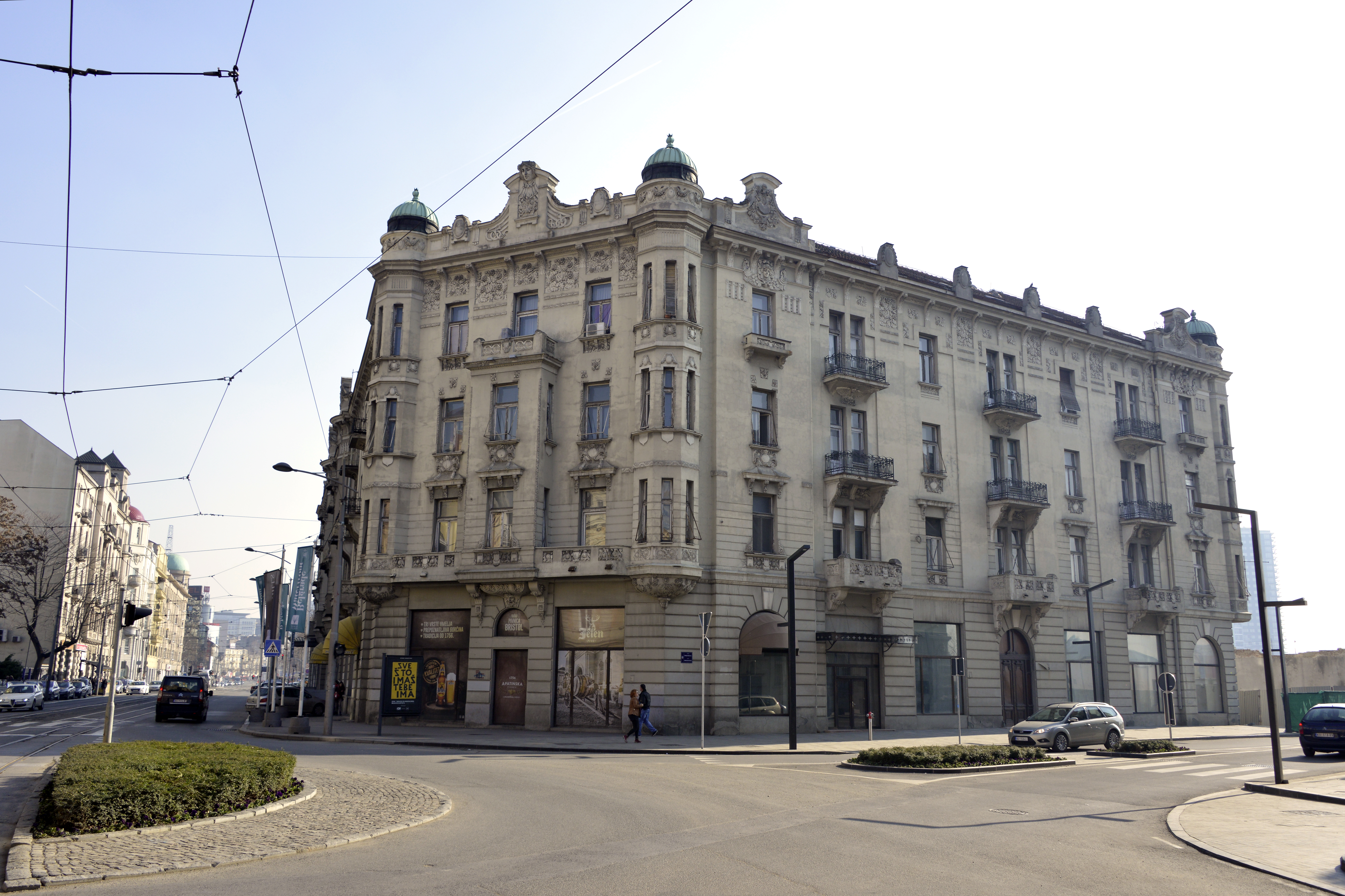
Hotel Bristol

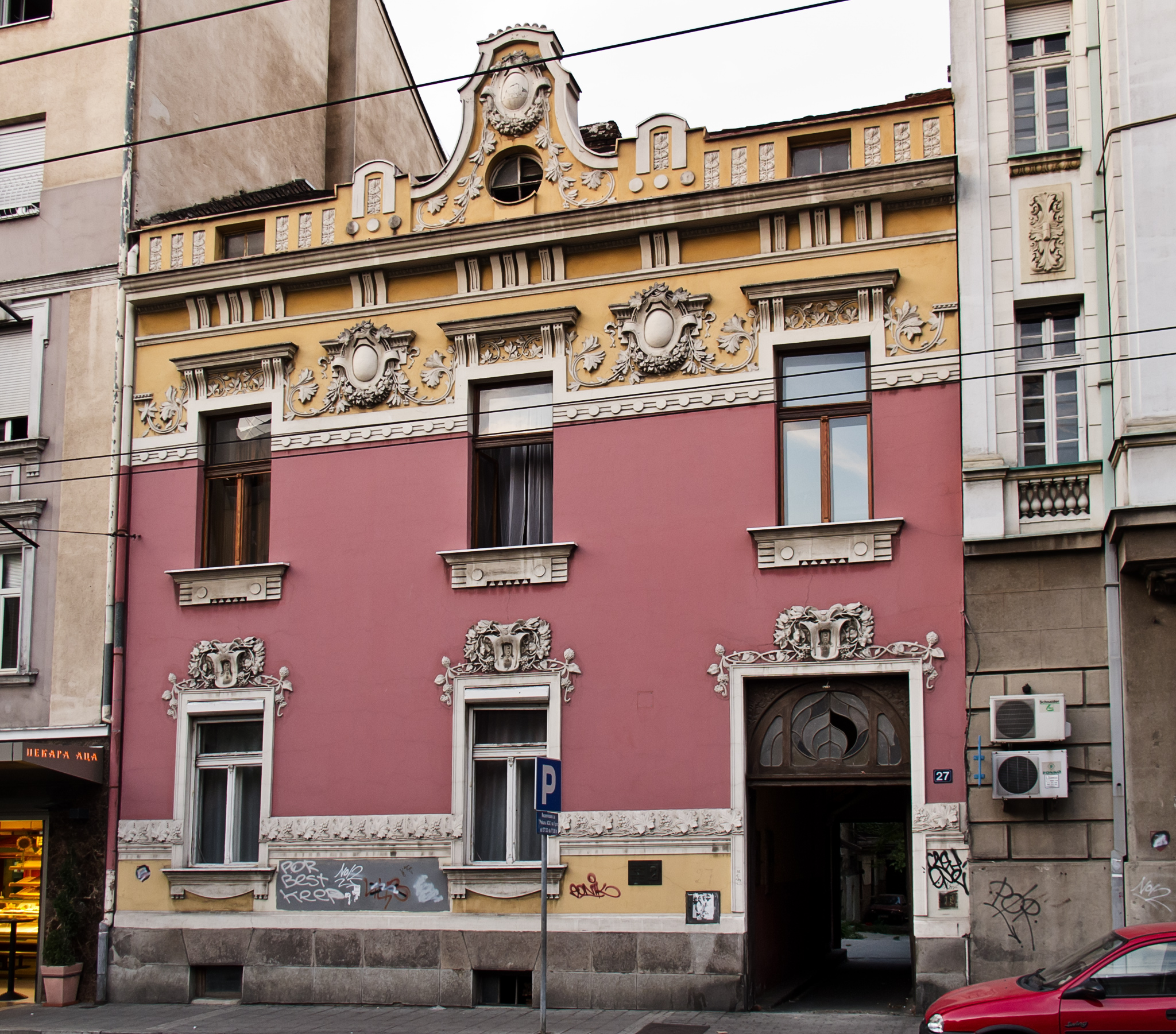
House of Uroš Predić, 1910

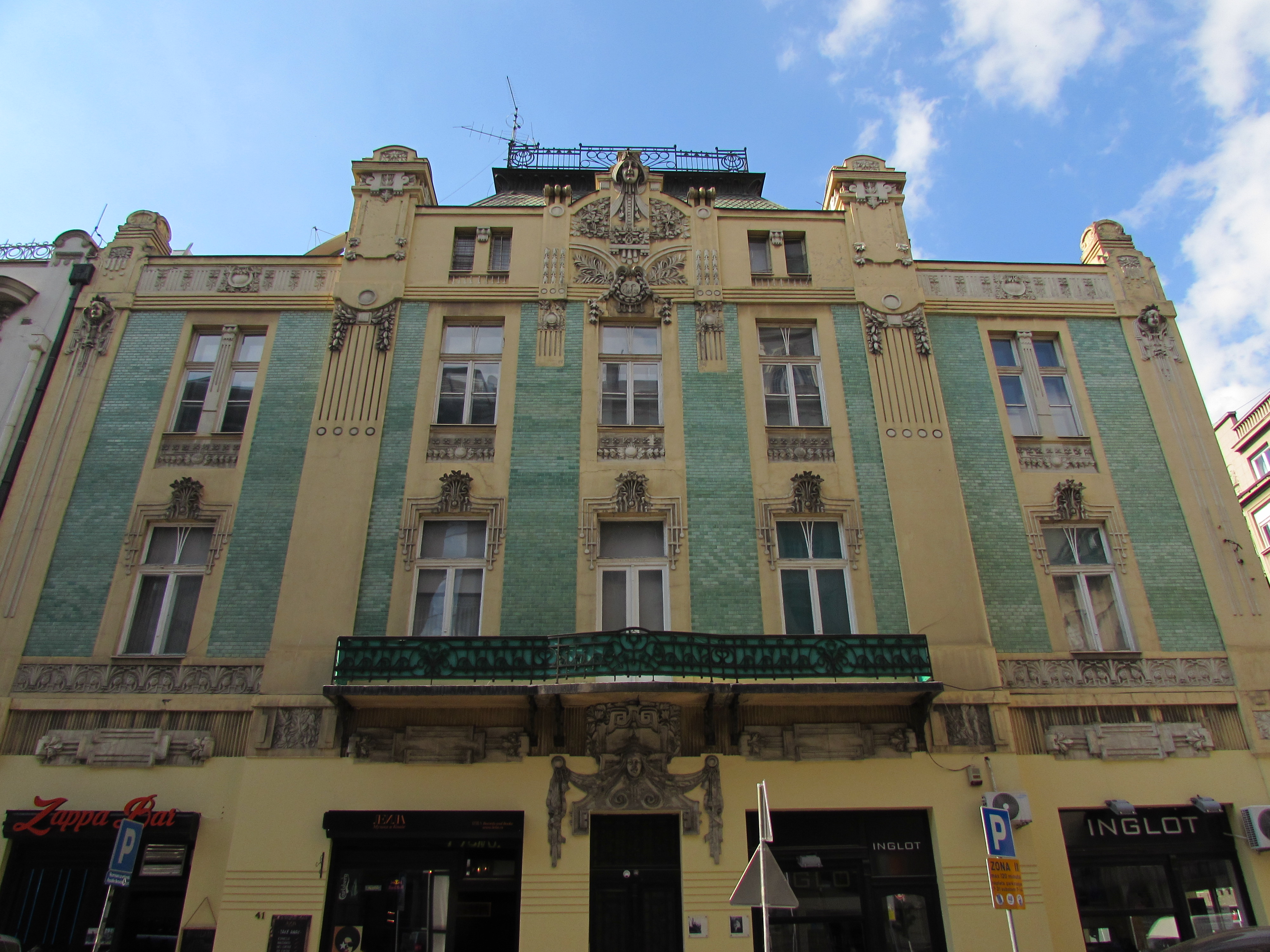
Building of Merchant Stamenković

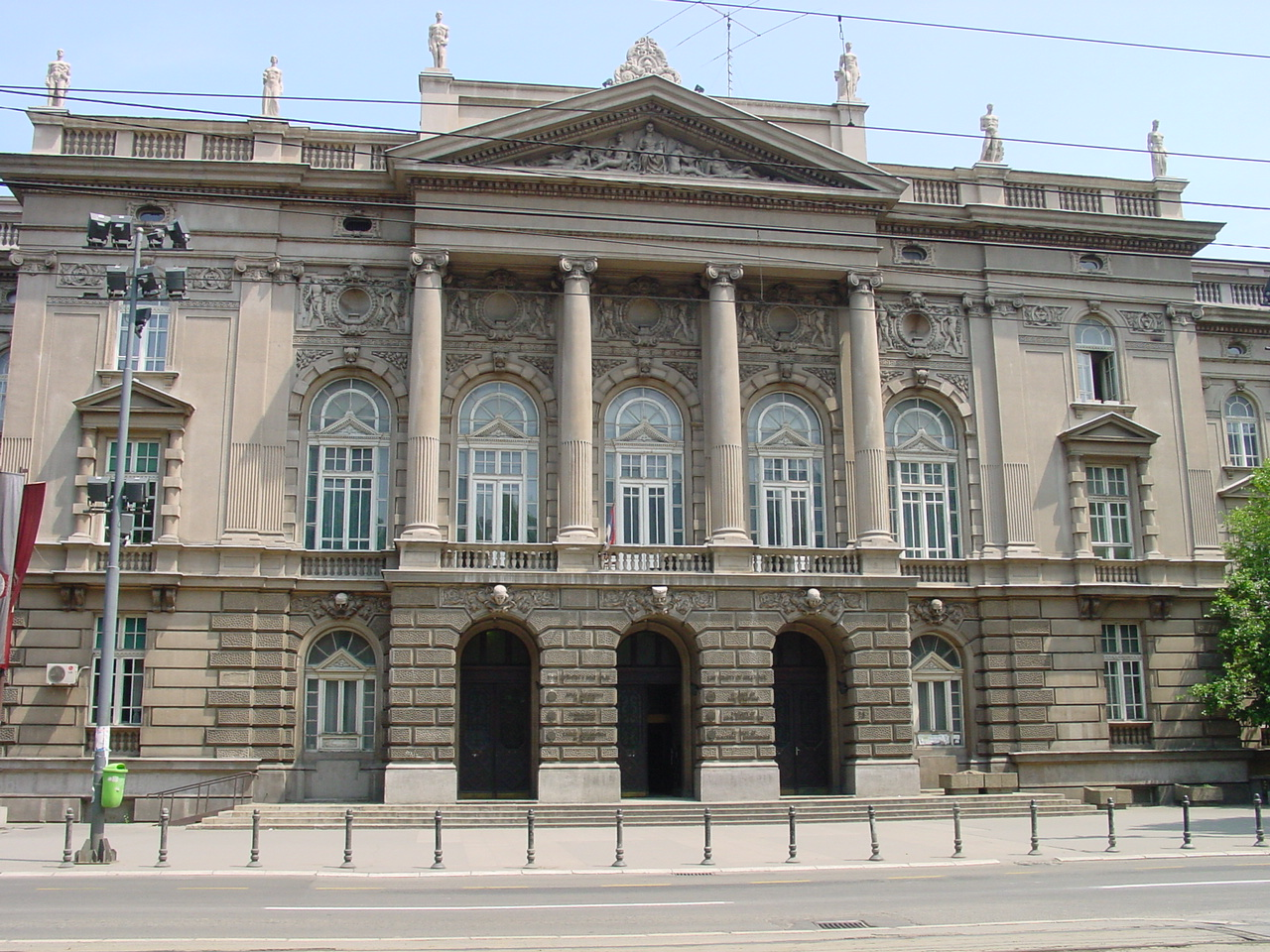
Building of the Technical Faculty

== See also ==
- List of Serbian architects

== Literature ==
- Дивна Ђурић-Замоло; Градитељи Београда 1815-1914
- Arhitektura Srbije u XIX Veku, Bogdan Nestorovic
