= Jovan Hadži-Vasiljević =

Serbian historian, ethnographer, journalist and writer

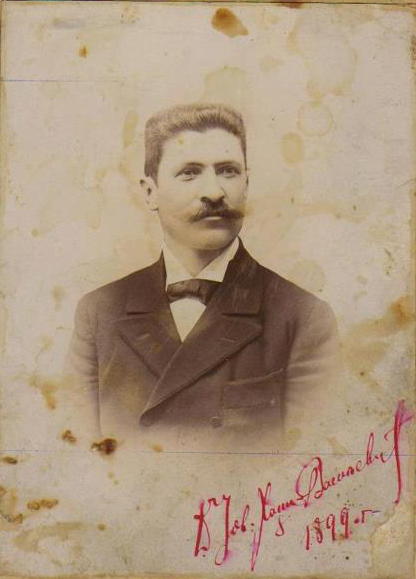

Jovan Hadži-Vasiljević (Serbian Cyrillic: Јован Хаџи-Васиљевић, 18 October 1866 – 29 March 1948) was a Serbian historian, ethnographer, journalist and writer.

== Biography ==
Hadži-Vasiljević was born in Vranje, at the time part of the Sanjak of Niš of the Ottoman Empire until it was captured by the Serbian Army in 1878. His father was Hadži Vasilije of the Pogačarević family, and his mother Katerina was the daughter of the churchwarden (ikonom) of Kumanovo, Dimitrije Mladenović (1794–1880). The Pogačarević family (also known as Pogačarci) hailed from Rakovac, having settled in Vranje at the end of the 18th century. He finished primary school in Vranje, gymnasium in Vranje and Niš, and the Great School in Belgrade at the History and Philology faculties. He received his Philosophy doctorate at the University of Vienna in 1898. As an official of the Ministry of Foreign Affairs he served from 1898 to 1904 in Bitola, Skopje and Belgrade. After he left the civil service in 1904, he was the secretary of the Society of Saint Sava until 1940. Throughout his life he worked for the national enlightenment of Serbs in the Ottoman Empire. He participated in the Balkan Wars and the First World War. He retreated with the Second Morava Division through Albania, which he described. Hadži-Vasiljević wrote extensively on history, geography and ethnology. The high value of his work is due to the basis on field research, especially in the areas of Old Serbia and Macedonia (South Serbia). He wrote over 200 historical and ethnographical works about those regions. He was the editor of the Brastvo journal of the Society of Saint Sava.

== Work ==
Among his most notable works are:

- Prilep i njegova okolina, Beograd, 1902;
- Južna Stara Srbija, istorijska, etnografska i politička istraživanja I–II, Beograd, 1909, 1913;
- Bugarska zverstva u Vranju i okolini 1915–1918, Novi Sad, 1922;
- Četnička akcija u Staroj Srbiji i Maćedoniji, Beograd, 1928;
- Skoplje i njegova okolina, Beograd, 1930;
- Autobiografija, Vranje

== Legacy ==
A street is named after him in Vranje. A bust was erected in the City Park of Vranje on 1 October 2012, at the 100th anniversary of the liberation of southern Serbia.

== See also ==
- List of Chetnik voivodes
- Jovan Cvijić
- Zarija Popović
- Vladan Đorđević
- Ami Boué
- Alexander Hilferding

== Sources ==
- Jovan Hadži-Vasiljević. Autobiografija. Vranje.
- Trajković, Dragoljub (1981). "Јован Хаџи Васиљевић" (PDF). Лесковачки зборник. 21: 283–306.
