= Jovan Cvijić House =

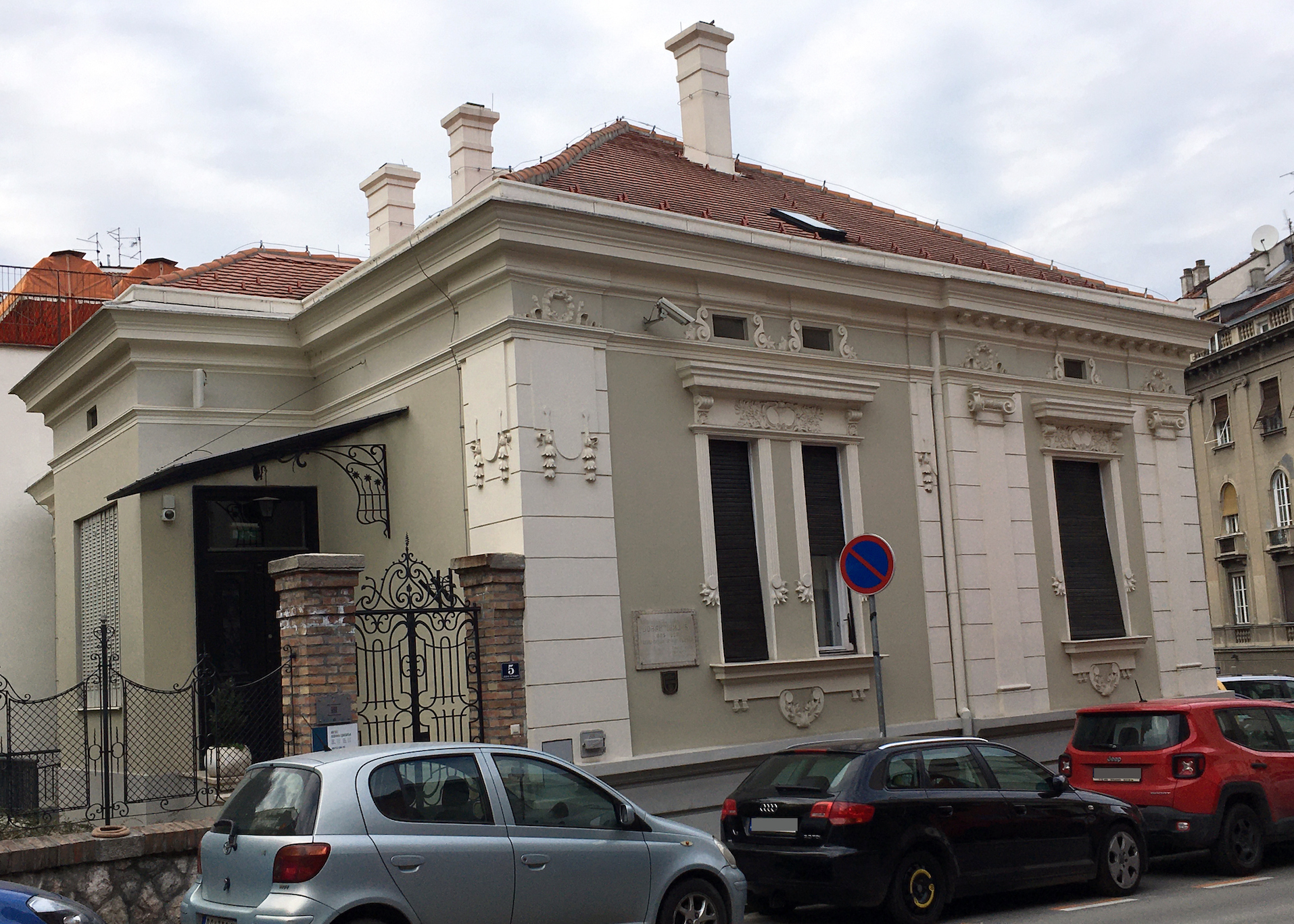
- Interactive map of the Jovan Cvijić House area

General information
- Location: Belgrade, Serbia
- Coordinates: 44.8157°N 20.4686°E
- Opened: 1905

Jovan Cvijić House is situated in Belgrade, in 5 Jelena Ćetković Street. The house was built in 1905, on the site of the former garden of Мitropolit Mihailo of Belgrade, which in 1907 was transformed into the square. A couple of years later, more precisely in 1924, the square was named Коpitareva gradina after the famous Slavist and linguist, Јеrnej Kopitar. Many important figures of that time used to build their houses in this area: a sculptor Petar Palaviccini, a doctor and a writer Laza Lazarević, an architect Milan Antonović.

== Architecture ==
Simple, well-proportioned, tailored to the measure of a modest man, it is a typical example of the houses that were built at the periphery of Belgrade in the late 19th and early 20th century. Along Jelene Ćetković Street Јоvan Cvijić built his house to his own design and taste. It was a small family house with a basement, a high ground floor and a garden. As the typical example of the Belgrade architecture in the early 20th century, the house is well-proportioned and well blended with the neighbouring buildings and houses. It was built by the famous Belgrade contractor Sreten Stojanović, like many other houses in Kopitareva gradina.

== Interior ==
The interior of the house is shaped in the sense of eclecticism with the elements of neo-renaissance. As far as the spatial conception is concerned, the residential area was clearly distinguished from the reception and study area. The scientist's personal belongings, the original furniture are the part of this unusual ambient. The painted decoration on the walls and ceilings, the work of a young painter Dragutin Inkiostri Medenjak, a scientist's good friend, represents the special value of the interior. The decoration was done in al secco technique. Reflecting the scientist's interest for the area of Balkan Peninsula, the thematic layer of painting was inspired by the landscape of Bosnia, Šumadija and Herzegovina, which Cvijić particularly explored and scientifically approached. Born in Split in 1866, Inkiostri started as a self-thought painter, and then studied painting in Florence. Travelling around Dalmatia, Bosnia, Montenegro, Kosovo and Metohija, he analysed the rich national art and collected folklore motifs, skilfully interpreting them through the modernization of „the national style“.

== The museum ==
Since 1967 Jovan Cvijić's house is the home to the Memorial Museum dedicated to his work. There are 1.476 objects of the legacy: personal items, the library and the collection of the ethnographic objects, which represents the authentic testimony of the life and work of the great scientist and the unique resourceful documentation material for the scientific analysis and museum exhibits. In the garden next to the house there is a Jovan Cvijić's bust, the work of Vladeta Petrić from 1965. Jovan Cvijić spent most of his life in a family house in 5 Jelena Ćetković Street, where he died on 16 January 1927. He bequeathed the house to his beloved wife Ljubica to live in it until her death, and then to the Jovan Cvijić Foundation, for the permanent use.

== The cultural monument ==
Marking the house in which Jovan Cvijić was born, lived and died, the executive board of NO Belgrade placed the marble memorial plaque on the facade of the house. Jovan Cvijić's house was designated a cultural property of a great importance (The Decision on designation, „The Official Gazette of SRS“, no. 14/79). The last conservatory works on the object were done in 2015/2016.
