= Jovan Cvijić =

Serbian scientist and academic (1865–1927)

- Јован Цвијић
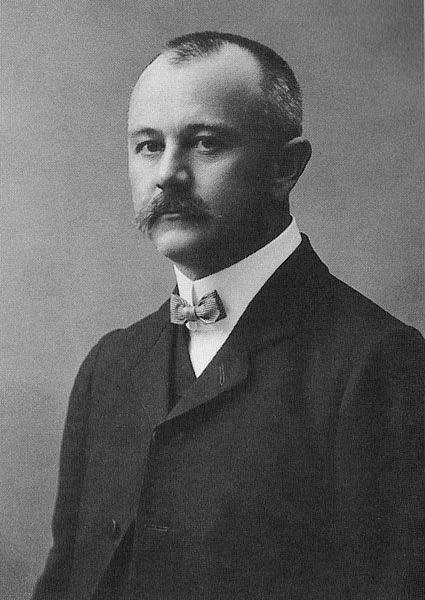
- Photograph by Milan Jovanović (1911)
- Born: 11 October 1865; Loznica, Principality of Serbia
- Died: 16 January 1927 (aged 61); Belgrade, Kingdom of Serbs, Croats and Slovenes
- Resting place: New Cemetery, Belgrade, Serbia
- Education: Belgrade Higher School; University of Vienna
- Scientific career
- Fields: Geography, geology, folklore
- Doctoral advisor: Albrecht Penck
- Notable students: Pavle Vujević

Signature
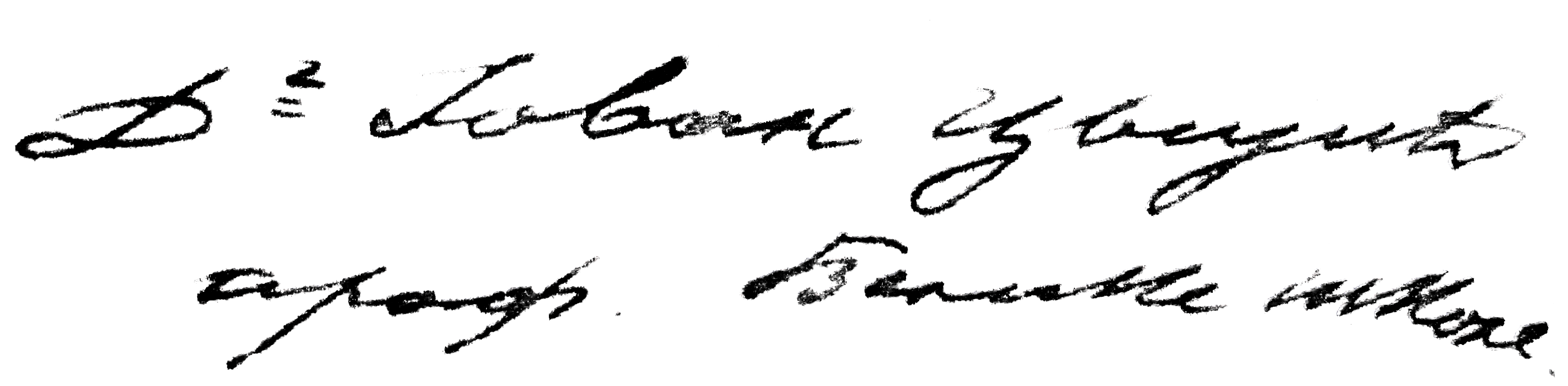

Jovan Cvijić (Serbian Cyrillic: Јован Цвијић, pronounced [jǒʋan tsʋǐːjitɕ]; 11 October [O.S. 29 September] 1865 – 16 January 1927) was a Serbian geographer, ethnologist, university professor and academic.

He was the president of the Serbian Royal Academy of Sciences and rector of the University of Belgrade. Cvijić is considered the founder of geography in Serbia. He began his scientific career as a geographer and geologist, and continued his activity as a human geographer and sociologist. He initiated the Serbian Ethnographic Collection (Srpski etnološki zbornik), within which 102 books were published, representing a unique scientific and interdisciplinary project on a global scale. Jovan Cvijić received numerous awards and medals, both domestically and internationally, for his work.

== Early life and family ==
Cvijić was born in Loznica, in the westernmost part of the Principality of Serbia. His family was part of the Spasojević branch of the Piva tribe (Pivljani) in Old Herzegovina (currently Montenegro). Cvijić's father, Todor, was a merchant; his grandfather, Živko, was head of Loznica and a supporter of the House of Obrenović in Mačva. Živko fought in the 1844 Katana Uprising against the Defenders of the Constitution, and died after torture.

Cvijić's great-grandfather, Cvijo Spasojević, patriarch of the Cvijić family, was a hajduk leader in Old Herzegovina who fought in the First Serbian Uprising against the Ottoman Empire. After its failure in 1813, he moved to Loznica, built a house and opened a store.

His father, Todor (d. 1900), was a trader before accepting a clerkship in the municipality. Cvijić's mother, Marija (née Avramović), was from a family in the village of Korenita in the Jadar region (near Tronoša and Tršić, the birthplace of Vuk Stefanović Karadžić). Todor and Marija had two sons, Živko and Jovan, and three daughters. Cvijić often said that in his childhood his spiritual education was primarily influenced by his mother and her family; he said less about his father and his father's family. However, in his works on ethnic psychology, Cvijić praised the Dinaric race of his father.

== Education ==
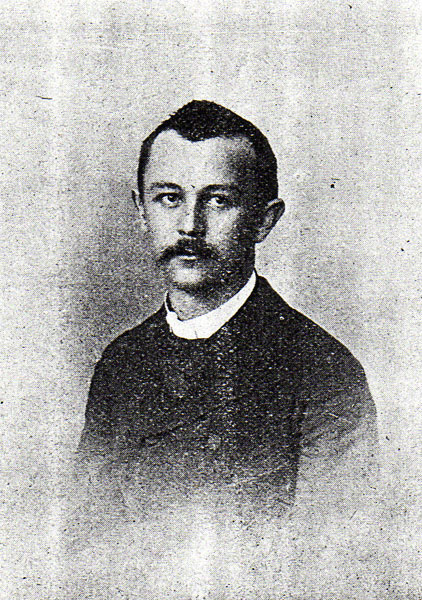
Cvijić as a young man

After completing elementary school, Cvijić attended grammar school in Loznica where he took an interest in literature and learned French and German.

He continued his education in Šabac before embarking to the First Belgrade Gymnasium to study medicine, graduating in 1884.

After graduation, he wanted to study medicine, but Loznica could not provide him a scholarship to study abroad. A grammar-school teacher suggested that he attend geography classes at the Velika škola in Belgrade. Cvijić took his advice, enrolling in the natural sciences department and graduating in 1889.

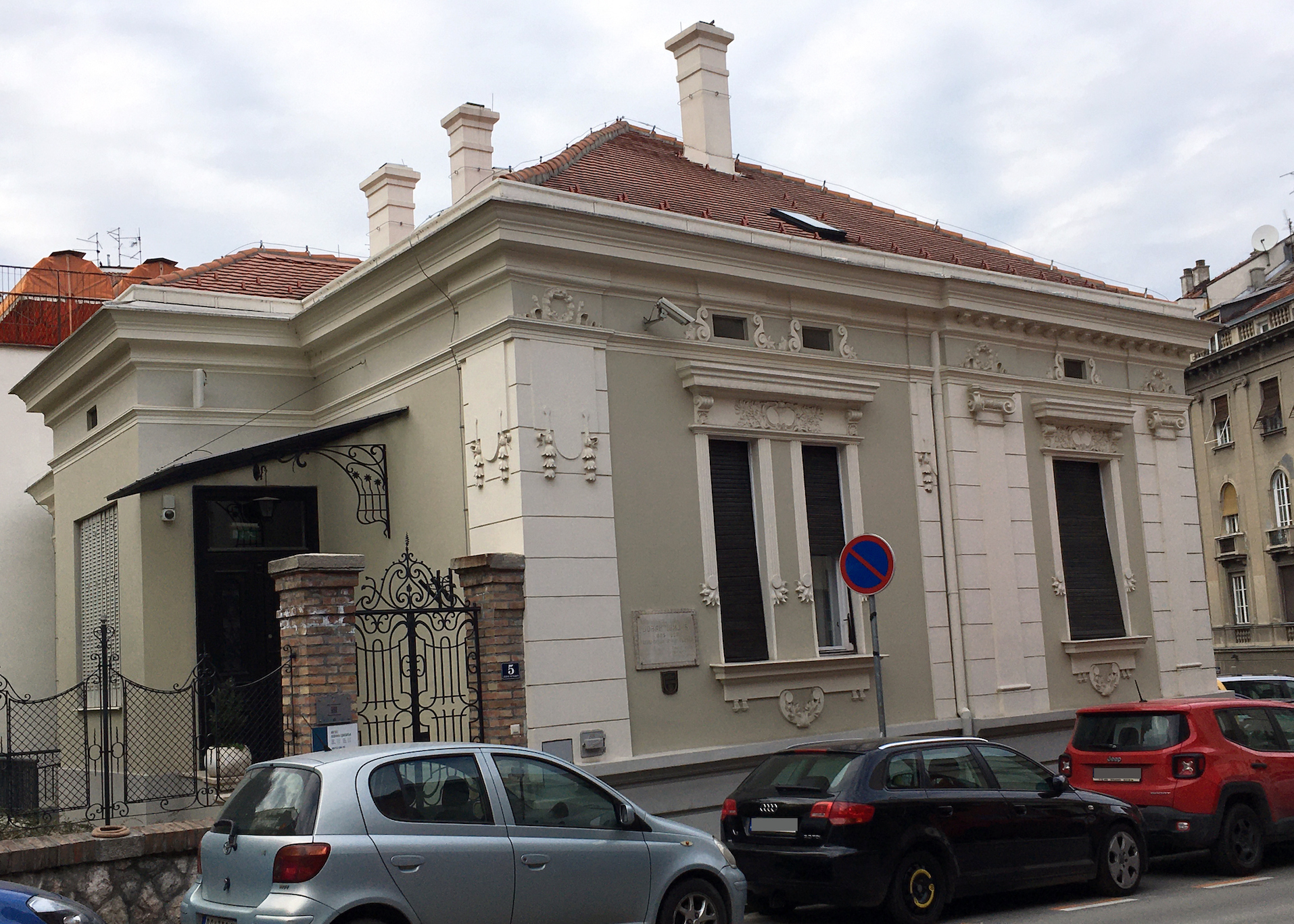
House of Jovan Cvijić in Belgrade, street view

Cvijić taught at the Second Male Grammar School in Belgrade and in the meantime published his first geographical work on the karst landscape in 1889 after a trip to the eastern countryside of Serbia piqued his interest.

He enrolled at Vienna University where he studied physical geography and geology under the tutelages of scholars like Albrecht Penck, Professor Suess (president of the Austrian Academy) and Julius von Hann. He received his PhD from Vienna University in 1893. His thesis Das Karstphänomen, introduced the sub-discipline study of karst geomorphology.

Soon afterwards, Cvijić toured the Balkans to conduct fieldwork and research.

In 1911, Cvijić married Ljubica Nikolić, a widow from Belgrade, née Krstić (1879–1941).

== Research ==
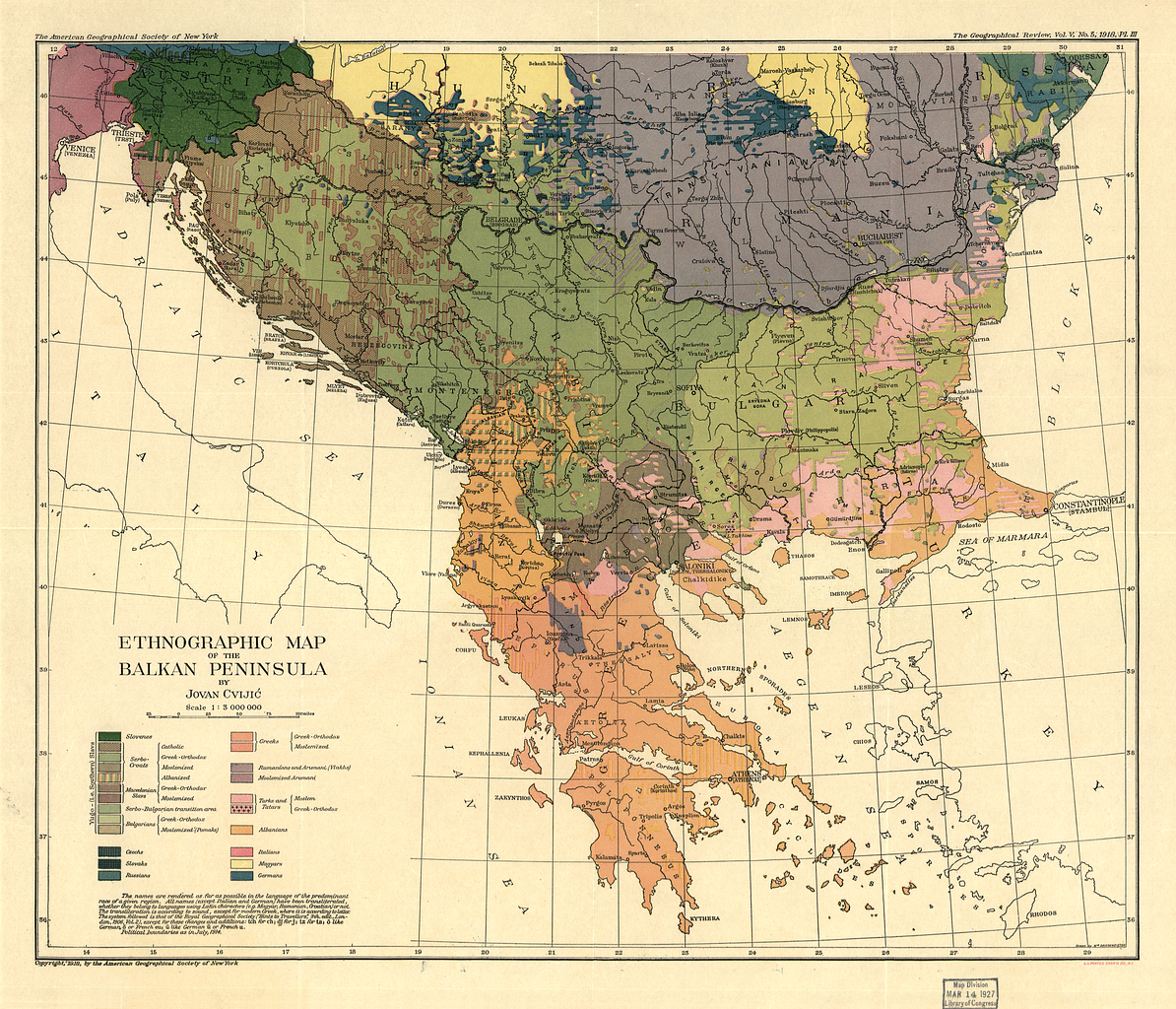
Ethnographic map of the Balkans, co-authored by Cvijić

Cvijić's work can be compartmentalized into five sections: the karst, glaciations in the Balkan mountains, tectonic elements in the peninsula, lakes and human geography. Much of his research was complicated by the tense political situations with the Austro-Hungarian and Ottoman authorities, dangerous and remote areas and lack of suitable roads and maps.

In the mid 1890s, Cvijić's excursions took him first to eastern Serbia and then to Bulgaria, where he visited the area around the Rila mountain range. Later, he focused on the mountains of Bosnia and Herzegovina and Montenegro, studying the karst and tectonic structure, looking for evidence of glaciations, leading him to publish Papers on the glacial epoch in the Balkan peninsula.

He was interested in geology and geomorphology. Cvijić's monograph on lime karst was well received in European scientific circles, and an introductory academic lecture established him as the first South Slavic tectonicist. The Serbian lime fields had been studied only peripherally by Otto von Pirch (1830), Ami Boué (1840), Felix Philipp Kanitz, Milan Milićević, Jovan Žujović and Vladimir Karić before him.

Cvijić conducted a pioneering human-geographical survey in "Balkan Peninsula 1918", 1922–I, 1931–II, based on his research of Balkan personality types. He researched for 38 years, leading expeditions in the Balkans, the southern Carpathian Mountains and Anatolia which produced a number of research papers. Cvijić's two-volume Geomorphology is an important starting point for research into the Balkan peninsula.

=== Karst geomorphology ===
When studying under Albrecht Penck's tutelage he was encouraged to focus on the study of karst phenomena in the northern Dinaric Alps which was a region Penck was already acknowledged with. His first major work was Das Karstphänomen published in 1893. This work was a publication of the key points of his doctoral thesis. Das Karstphänomen was published as a slightly modified translation in Serbo-Croat in 1895. This work describes landforms such as karren, dolines and poljes. In a 1918 publication, Cvijić proposed a cyclical model for karstic landscape development. The results of this work written in French were made accessible to English-language scientists in 1921 when it was commented by E.M. Sanders. Differences in climate and geology were used by Cvijić to explain various shapes and types of karst landforms, sometimes incorrectly. Nevertheless, his views on the role of climate on the development of karst were more accurate than those of various climatic geomorphologists that succeeded him and who greatly exaggerated the role of climate.

It has been attributed to Cvijić that the term karst prevailed over Edouard Martel's proposed term "Le Causse". Another terminology usage indebted to Cvijić is that of doline, a term he introduced, and that overlaps with that of sinkhole. Eventually, Cvijić emerged as the "father of karst geomorphology".

=== Human geography ===
In 1896 Cvijić published "Instructions for studying villages in Serbia and other Serbian lands", which was later revised to apply to other Balkan regions.

Concurrently, he developed an interest in the life of people living in the Balkans. His travels took him to Macedonia and its lakes, the coastlines of Albania and Greece, to Lake Skadar and Lake Pamvotida. In 1902 he published his first work on human geography. In 1906 he published his signature monograph Basics of Geography and Geology of Macedonia and Old Serbia, which became a staple reference for future researchers.

He published detailed instructions for conducting field research into populations and habitats to help his colleagues, including the 1907 article "On scientific research and our University".

Cvijić's thesis on the effects of climate and geography on human life is the basis of his approach to human geography, where he emphasizes that humankind is ecologically sensitive. When classifying anthropological types Cvijić considered social structure (work, endogamy, exogamy and migration) the primary factor, stressing the effects of the physical environment on a population's psyche. His basic concepts are presented in the 1902 Balkan-peninsula paper, "Human-geography problems". Influenced by Cvijić's paper, Milorad Dragić (a former student) elaborated on psychological anthropological research in his 1911 paper "Instructions for studying settlements and psychological characteristics" (after which Cvijić expanded his thesis on "The Balkan peninsula and South Slavic lands" in Serbian).

Cvijić introduced the term 'metanastasic movements', which referred to slow, gradual, a place-to-place human movement. He and his students took wide exploration of this phenomenon, eventually establishing the Serbian ethnological-historic school which gathered ethnological material from all around the Balkan peninsula and encompassed exploration of written sources.

The sparking of interest in human-geographical and ethnographical research was one of the greatest achievements of Cvijić's scientific career. His efforts and research helped him gather crucial data, which he used during negotiations on the state borders of the Kingdom of Yugoslavia after World War I.

==== Influence on Yugoslav state borders ====
After the conclusion of World War I, Cvijić was invited to the Paris Peace Conference as an expert on border delineation. Using ethnographic charts, Cvijić demonstrated the geographical distribution of the various Balkan peoples which helped determine the borders of a new country: the Kingdom of Serbs, Croats and Slovenes. It was agreed that the new country should incorporate Banat, Bačka, Baranya and Carniola as well as the Bled triangle (Bled, Bohinj and Triglav).

== Teaching ==
After Cvijić's return from Vienna in March 1893 he became a professor in the Faculty of Philosophy of the Velika škola in Belgrade where he taught geography. He was tenured and taught there until 1927.

Cvijić played an active role in reforming the school, helping found an ethnography department whose first professor was his oldest student and assistant, Jovan Erdeljanović (followed by Tihomir Đorđević); Cvijić remained in the geography department. He was influential in establishing five new faculties: medicine, agriculture and theology in Belgrade, philosophy in Skopje and the Subotica Law School. From 1906 to 1907 he was rector of Belgrade University and again from 1919.

In 1915 he lectured about the Balkans at Sorbonne University in Paris.

== Views ==
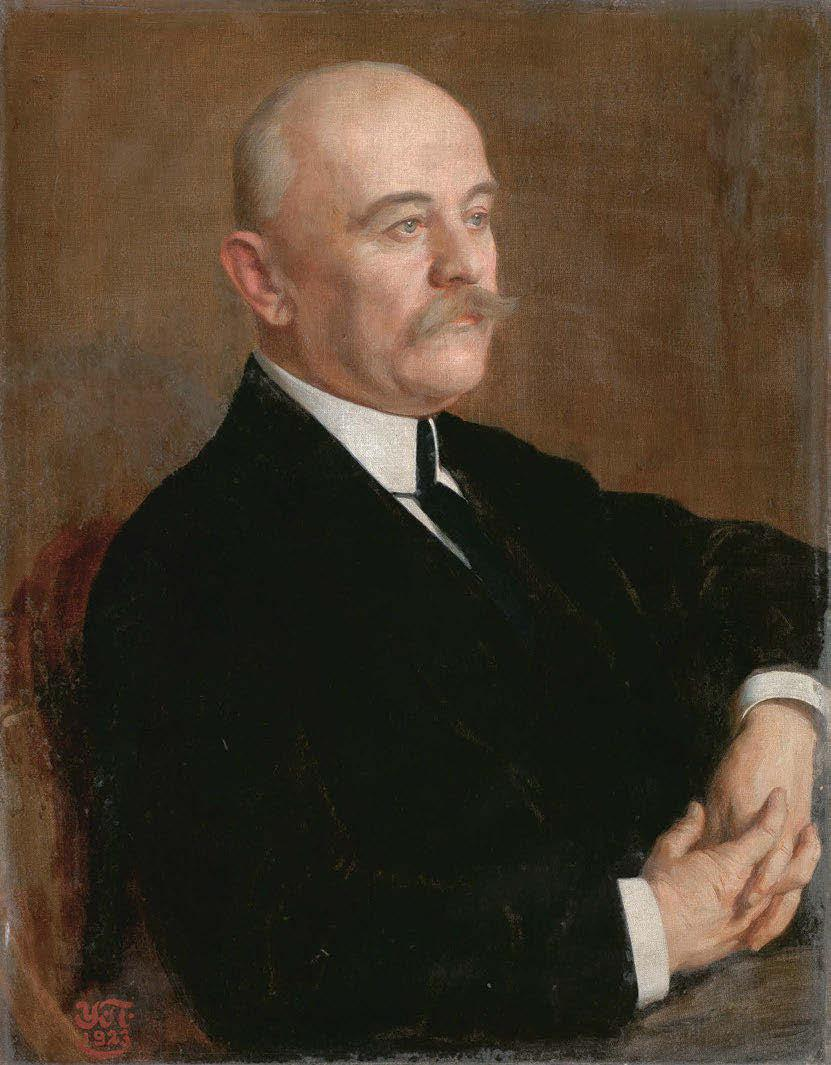
Portrait of Cvijić by Uroš Predić

=== Critique of education ===
Cvijić thought that the grammar-school education of that era should last seven years, instead of eight, and felt that young men should be included early in adult life and independent work.

Grammar school forms the intelligence and character perhaps even deeper and stronger than university; it influences the spirit and moral value of future intellectuals. Besides university, the moral and spiritual situation and its development depend on the type of grammar school, what will its civilization get, and in the end, will it slow or interfere with the development of great personalities, which show the properties of one nation.

=== Territorial expansion ===
Cvijić' s scientific impartiality has been criticized for his support of Serbia's political advancement; his geographic work was used to scientifically justify politics of territorial expansion and further territorial claims.

... For economic independence, Serbia must acquire access to the Adriatic Sea and one part of the Albanian coastline: by occupation of the territory or by acquiring economic and transportation rights to this region. This, therefore, implies occupying an ethnographically foreign territory, but one that must be occupied due to particularly important economic interests and vital needs.

According to Cvijić, Bulgarians were "different from the other South Slavs in their ethnic composition". He described as Slav three ethnographic groups previously considered Bulgarians: the Macedonian Slavs, the Shopi and the Torlaks. Cvijić excluded the region around Sofia (Bulgaria's capital) from the Bulgarian group, maintaining that the aforementioned groups were Slavic (and therefore Serbian). He believed that Serbia could govern a much larger area than the territory it held.

== Legacy ==
You should get used to constant thinking about a problem, work, profession until you find a solution. There are bright moments, especially bright nights, which are rare; where you can find an answer to a question or come up with a research plan. That time of spiritual lucidity and creativity should be put to use, and not thinking about rest according to that ordinary human, oriental laziness. That does not hurt the body, and if it does hurt, the body exists in order to be spent properly.

With a group of geographers and biologists, Cvijić founded the Serbian Geographic Society in Belgrade in 1910 and was its president until his death. In 1912 he began a magazine, the Serbian Geographic Society Herald, which is still published. Cvijić conducted weekly seminars for science students, which were also attended by teachers from Belgrade grammar schools. He founded the Faculty of Philosophy's Geographical Institute in 1923 (the first such organization in the Balkans), managing it until his death.

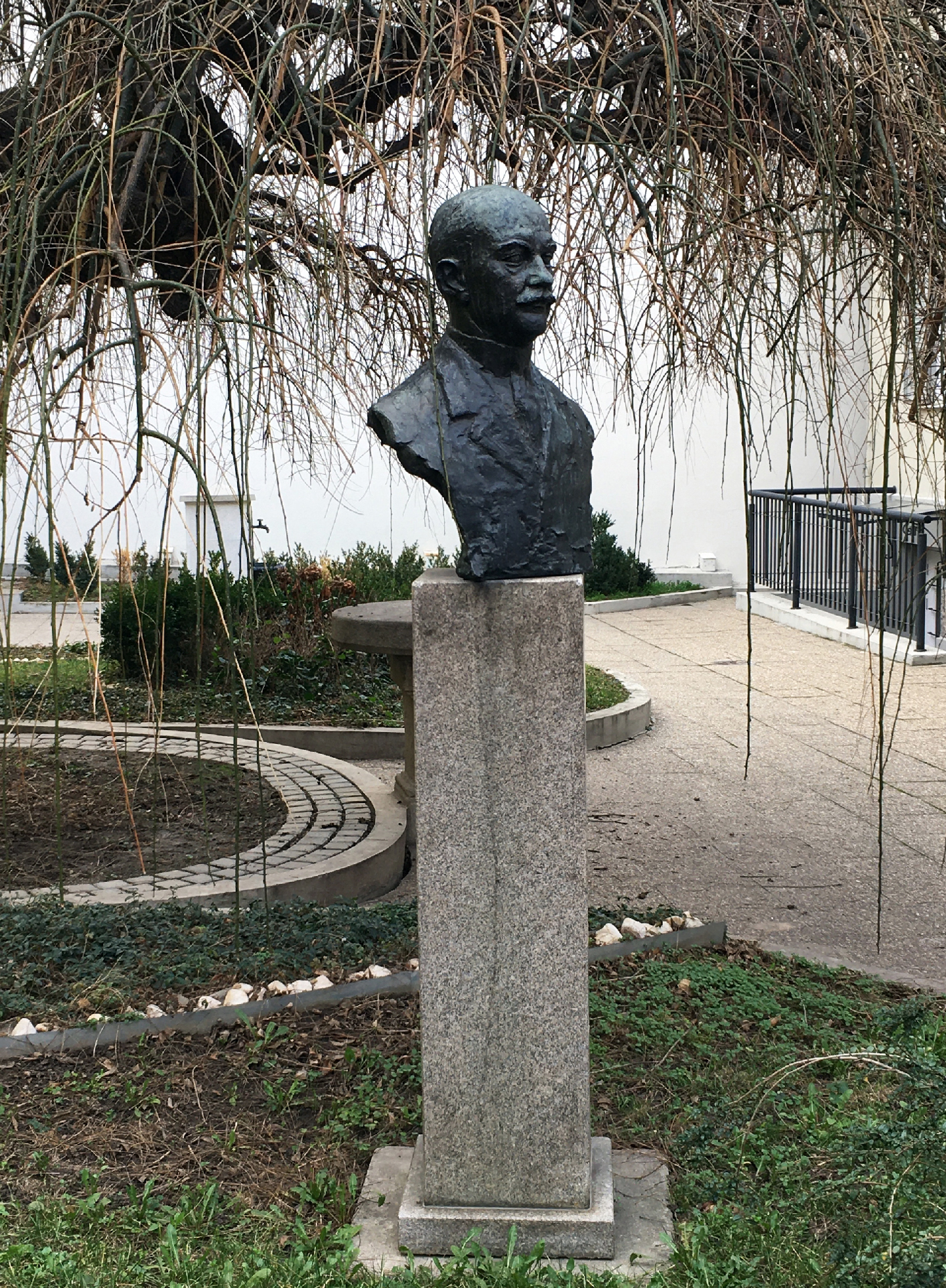
Statue of Cvijić in Belgrade

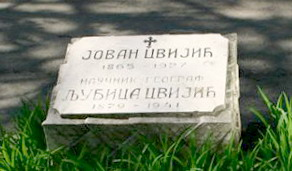
Cvijić's grave

On May 31, 1947, the Serbian Academy of Sciences and Arts founded the Jovan Cvijić Geographical Institute in Belgrade. On 21–22 November 2002, the Academy hosted a meeting on "the socio-political work of Jovan Cvijić".

The Jovan Cvijić's house is housed in his family's house in Belgrade at 5 Jelena Ćetković Street. Since 1996, the house (built in 1905) has been declared a cultural monument by the state and was decorated by Dragutin Inkiostri Medenjak; Cvijić favored a decorative style based on Balkan folklore. The museum features manuscripts, letters, notes, books, paintings, geographical charts, atlases and personal items, and occasional lectures are presented.

In Serbia, a number of schools and streets are named after Cvijić and he is still considered the most important Serbian geographer.

His work has been continued by his students, six of whom later became members of the Serbian Academy (including Pavle Vujević, Borivoje Z. Milojević and Milisav Lutovac). The scientist's life and work were researched by geographer Milorad Vasović for his 454-page book, Jovan Cvijić: Scientist, Public Worker, Statesman (1994).

== Academic honors ==
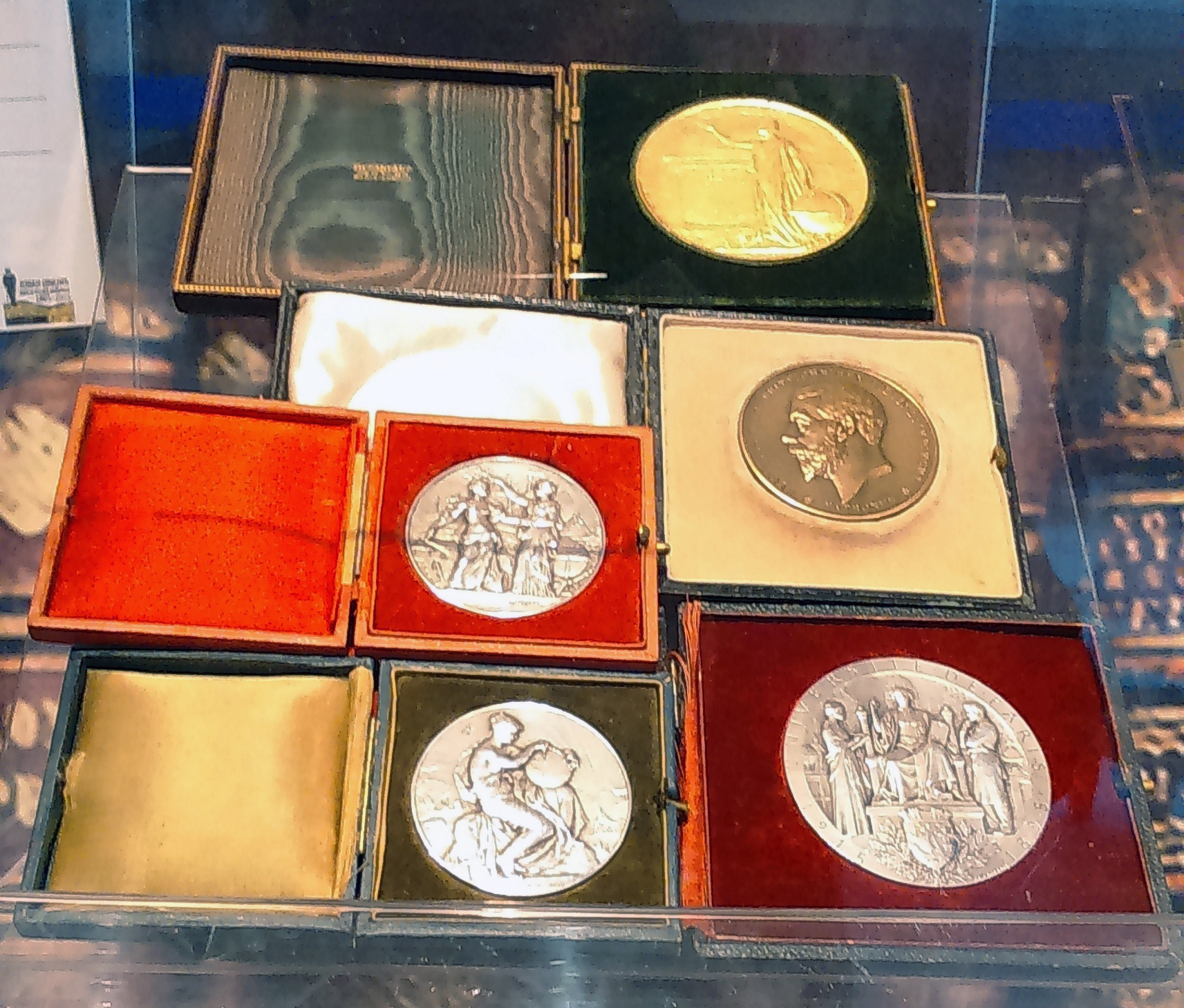
International medals awarded to Cvijić

Cvijić received a number of awards. He belonged to 30 scientific societies (academies, geographical and natural societies), receiving ten decorations. Cvijić received a gold medal for his work in 1924 from the New York Geographical Society and medals from England and France. Two varieties of saffron were named after him.

Cvijić was awarded:

- 1901: Order of Saint Sava, III class
- 1903: Prix Conrad Malte-Brun Golden Medal
- 1904: Order of Saint Sava, II class
- 1907: Order of Prince Danilo I, II class
- 1909: Order of Saint Alexander, II class
- 1911: Legion of Honour, Commander
- 1911: Order of the White Eagle, V class
- 1917: Prix Eugen Patron Silver Medal of Geographical society of Paris
- 1918: Medal of the Charles University in Prague
- 1920: Patron's Medal of the Royal Geographical Society
- 1920: Order of the Charity Cross
- 1923: Order of Saint Sava, I class
- 1924: Cullum Geographical Medal
- 1924: Medal of the Paris-Sorbonne University
- 1924: Gold medal of the American geographical society, New York
- 1925: Order of the White lion

Cvijić was named:

- Honorary doctor, University of Paris
- Honorary doctor, Charles University in Prague
- Member of the Serbian Royal Academy
- Member of the Czech Academy
- Member of the Academy in Brussels
- Corresponding Member of the Yugoslav Academy of Sciences and Arts, Zagreb
- Corresponding Member of the Royal Academy of Italy
- Corresponding Member of the Academy of Sciences of the Soviet Union
- Corresponding Member of the Parmasus Science Association, Athens
- Corresponding Member of the Russian Geographical Society, Saint Petersburg
- Corresponding Member of geographical societies in Budapest, Vienna, Geneva, Warsaw, Bucharest, Munich, Berlin, Amsterdam and London
- Honorary president of the Congress of Geographers and Ethnologists, Prague (1922)
- Honorary member, Matica srpska
- President of the Serbian Royal Academy from 12 April 1921 until his death in 1927
- Rector of the University of Belgrade (twice)

== Works ==
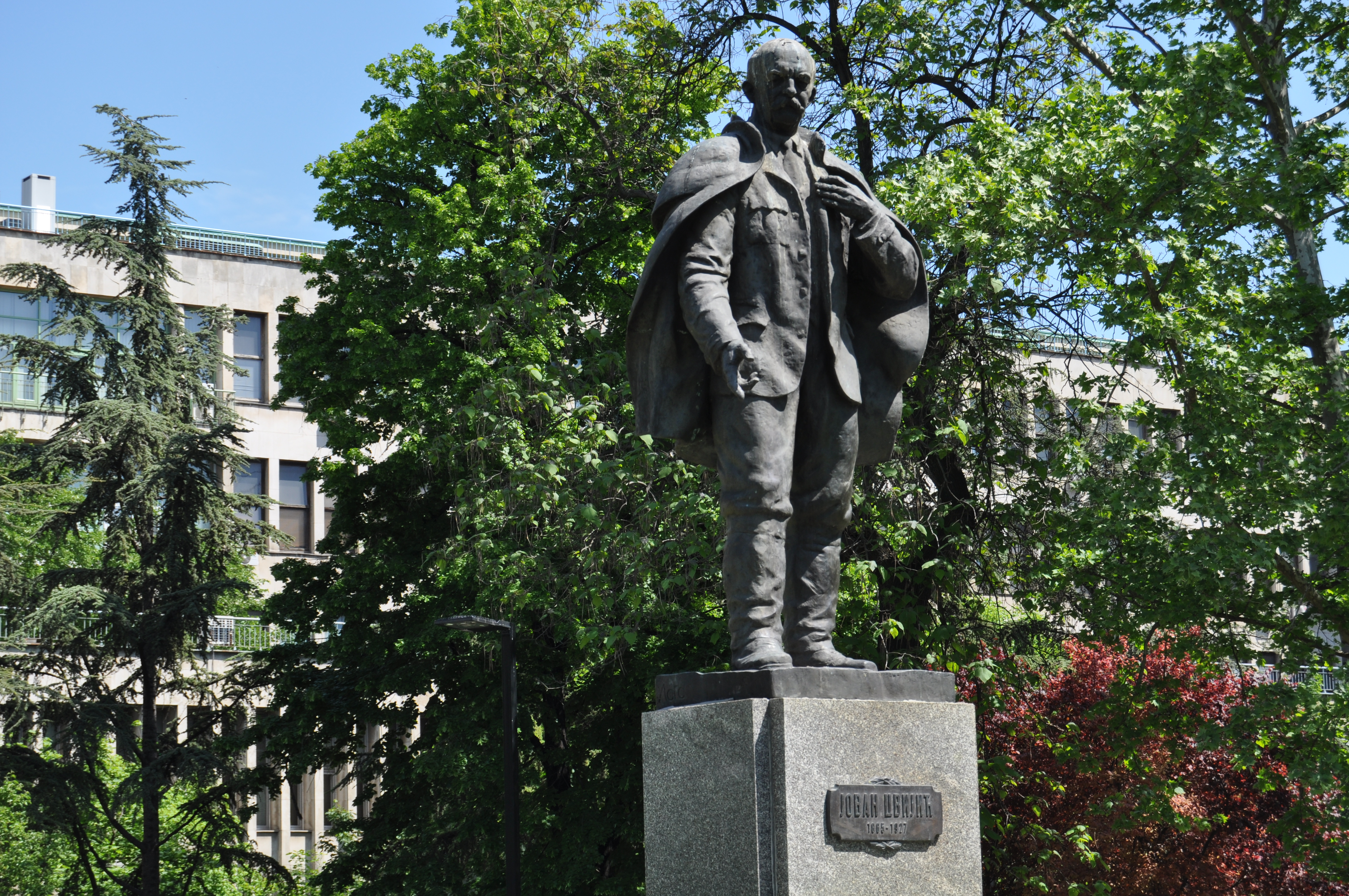
Monument to Jovan Cvijić in Academy Park, Belgrade

In more than 30 years of scientific study, Cvijić published many works. One of the best-known is The Balkan Peninsula. Other publications include:

- Prilog geografskoj terminologiji našoj, 1887
- Ka poznavanju krša istočne Srbije, 1889
- Prekonoška pećina, 1891
- Srednja visina i površina Srbije i njenih oblasti, 1891
- Geografska ispitivanja u oblasti Kučaja, 1893
- Das Karstphänomen, Geographiche Abhandlungen, Wien, 1893
- Karst, geografska monografija, Belgrade 1895
- Pećine i podzemna hidrografija u istočnoj Srbiji, 1895
- Izvori, tresave i vodopadi u istočnoj Srbiji, 1896
- Tragovi starih glečera na Rili, 1897
- Glacijalne i morfološke studije o planinama Bosne, Hercegovine i Crne Gore, 1899
- Karsna polja zapadne Bosne i Hercegovine, 1900
- Struktura i podela planina Balkanskog poluostrva, 1902
- Antropogeografski problemi Balkanskog poluostrva, 1902
- Novi rezultati o glacijalnoj eposi Balkanskog poluostrva, 1903
- Balkanska, alpijska i karpatska glacijacija, 1903
- "Die Tektonik der Balkanhalbinsel mit besonderer Berückichtigung der neueren Fortschritte in der Kenntnis der Geologie von *Bulgarien, Serbien und Mazedonien". C.R. IX. Cong. géol. intern. de Vienne. Wien: Hollinek Fréres. 1904. pp. 348–370 – via Internet Archive.
- Nekolika posmatranja o etnografiji makedonskih Slovena, 1906
- Osnove za geografiju i geologiju Makedonije i Stare Srbije, 1, 1906; 2, 1906; 3, 1911
- Grundlinien der Geographie und Geologie von Mazedonien und Alt-Serbien. Nebst Beobachtungen in Thrazien, Thessalien, Epirus und *Nordalbanien, 1908
- Jezerska plastika Šumadije, 1909
- L'anexion de la Bosnie et la question Serbe, Paris, 1909
- Dinarski Srbi, 1912
- Izlazak Srbije na Jadransko More, 1912
- Raspored Balkanskih naroda, 1913
- Ledeno doba u Prokletijama i okolnim planinama, 1913
- Jedinstvo i psihički tipovi dinarskih južnih Slavena, 1914
- Mouvements metanastasiques dans la Peninsule Balkanique, Le Monde Slave, 1917
- Hydrographie souterraine et évolution morphologique du Karst, 1918
- La Peninsule Balkanique, Geographie Humaine, 1918
- Etnogeografske karte jugoslovenskih zemalja, 1918
- Severna granica južnih Slavena (La frontiere septentrionale des Jugoslaves), 1919
- Đerdapske terase, 1922
- Balkansko poluostrvo i južnoslovenske zemlje, 1922
- Metanastazička kretanja, njihov uzrok i posledice, 1922
- Geomorfologija I-II, 1924. and 1926
- Karst i čovek, 1925
- Karst i srpske narodne pripovetke, 1925
- Seobe i etnički procesi u našem narodu, 1927
- Balkansko poluostrvo i južnoslavenske zemlje, 1931

== See also ==
- Jovan Hadži-Vasiljević
- Vladan Đorđević
- Zarija Popović
- Ami Boué
- Alexander Hilferding

Academic offices
Preceded by Sima Lozanić	Rector of University of Belgrade; 1906–1907	Succeeded by Andra J. Stevanović
Preceded by Đorđe Stanojević	Rector of University of Belgrade; 1919–1920	Succeeded by Slobodan Jovanović
Preceded by Jovan Žujović	President of Serbian Academy of Sciences and Arts; 1921–1927	Succeeded by Slobodan Jovanović
