= Zarija Popović =

Serbian national and educational worker, writer and head of State Statistics

Zarija R. Popović (Gjilan, 5 February 1856 - Belgrade, August 1934) was a Serbian national and educational worker, writer and head of State Statistics.

In 1870, Popović entered the oldest educational institution in the Belgrade the Saint Sava Seminary, founded in 1808 by the then minister of education Dositej Obradović. He was an excellent theology student, the first among his peers, and in the last year, he has ordained as a celibate priest by Metropolitan Mihailo, who recognized Zarija's natural acuity and intelligence for the teaching profession.

He first taught in his home town of Gjilan from 1874 to 1878 when he welcomed the victorious Serbian army. After the armed forces left Giljan, Popović went with the Serbian army to quell the attacks on the Serbs during the Serbian-Ottoman War in Vranje, where he remained as a teacher, and then as an administrative clerk at the Serbian Orthodox Diocese of Vranje. He was later twice appointed bishop by the Serbian Orthodox Church, to the Metropolitanate of Skopje and the Diocese of Prizren, but both times refused to accept the challenge, preferring to continue teaching instead.

In 1887, he was transferred to Belgrade and the Ministry of Education and the Public Relations Department for Education in Old Serbia and Macedonia. Two years later, when the department was added to the Ministry of Foreign Affairs, Zarija Popović started working at the Светосавсокој вечерњој школи/Svetosavsokoj večernjoj školi, the Saint Sava Evening School until 1912.

Popović wrote several interesting books recalling his time in Old Serbia.

== Works ==
- Pred Kosovom
- Pripovedke iz Stare Srbije

== See also ==
- Jovan Cvijić
- Vladan Đorđević
- Jovan Hadži-Vasiljević
- Ami Boué
- Alexander Hilferding
