= Vuk Foundation House =

Historical building in Belgrade

- Кућа Вукове Задужбине
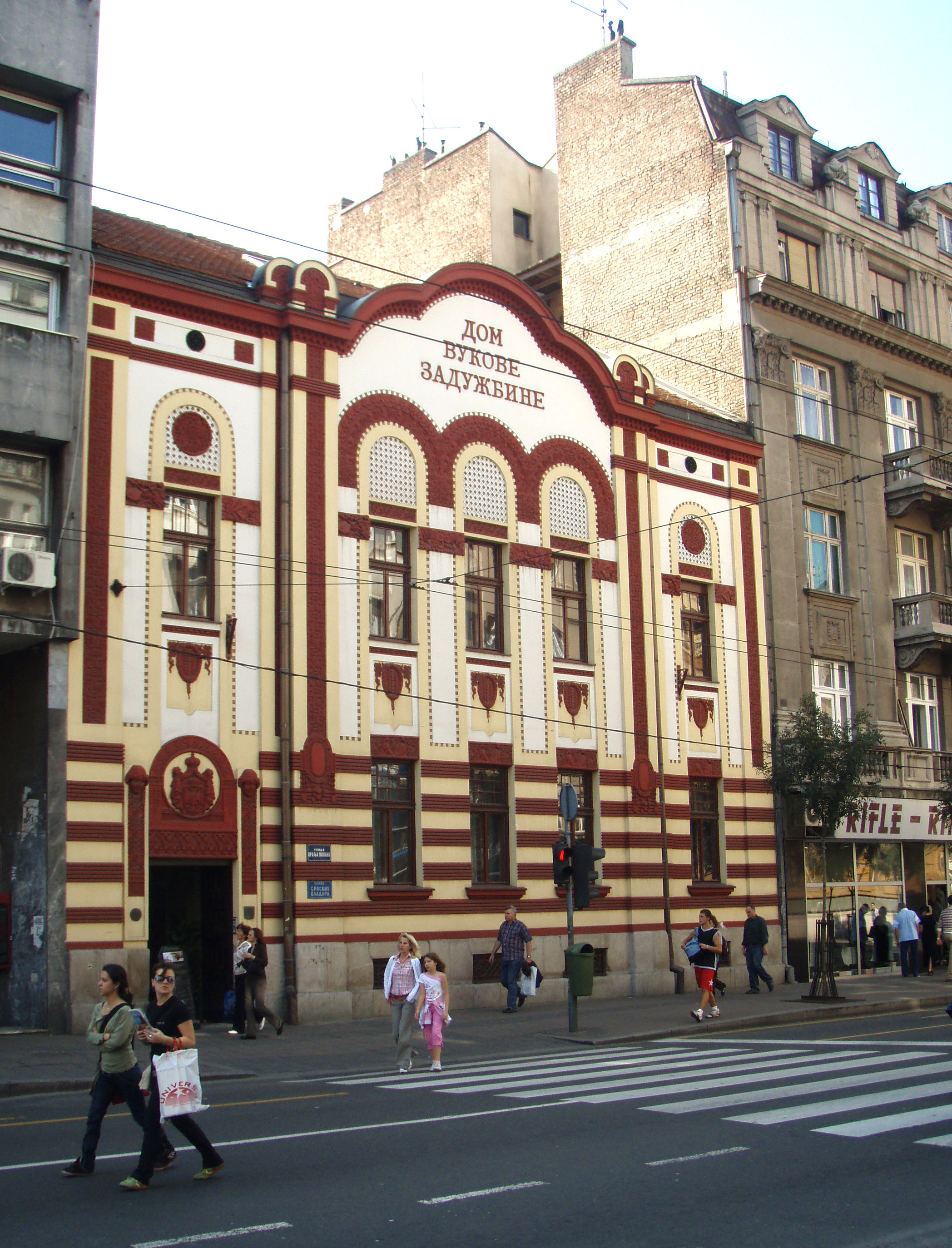
- View from outside

- Location within Belgrade

General information
- Location: 2 Kralja Milana Street, Terazije, Belgrade, Serbia
- Coordinates: 44.8111°N 20.4618°E
- Construction started: 1870
- Completed: 1879
- Opened: 1879

Design and construction
- Architect: Alexander Bulgarski

The Vuk Foundation House is the name of a historical building in Belgrade, built in 1879, that serves as the headquarters of the Vuk Foundation. Located on the Теrazije at 2 Kralja Milana Street, it is one of the oldest structures in that part of Belgrade. Aleksandar Bugarski, a prominent 19th-century Serbian architect, designed the original building as a two-story house in the Academic art style of the day.

== History ==
The building, whose architect was Alexander Bulgarski, was built in 1870/71 for the merchant Dimitrije Mita Golubović. In the beginning the building was the head office of the Russian Imperial Consulate, then the Serbian Institute for War Orphans, and was then used by the Ministry of Education in 1879. The smaller courtyard wing was repaired and upgraded in 1906, with the decorative works in the interior done by painter Dragutin Inkiostri Medenjak, who happened to be the only decorative painter in Belgrade at that time. Within these works, he included a folk ornament motif in accordance with the national style.

Due to the growth of the Ministry, there was a need to expand the building. This commenced in 1912 towards the Sava slope. A wing that included an interior courtyard was built by architect Branko Tanazević who also worked on the total reconstruction of the main front facade. Painter and decorator Dragutin Inkiostri Medenjak was put in charge of the interior. The two cooperated on the project, despite being fierce opponents as far as national style was concerned. Work on the facade and the interior was done in a Serbian-Byzantine style according to Tanazević's design.

The last renovation of the building for the Ministry – the new wing towards the Kraljica Natalija Street – was carried out in 1924, designed by architect Žarko Tatić.

The building was home to the Ministry of Education from 1879 until 1952. It has housed the Church Department of the Ministry of Education of the Principality of Serbia since 1880. In 1914, the building also housed the Foundation Department of the Ministry of Education of the Kingdom of Serbia. The Artistic Department of the Kingdom of SHS and the Kingdom of Yugoslavia also moved into the building in 1919. Despite the expansion, certain departments of the Ministry of Education remained outside the main building. During the period of occupation in the First World War, the building was used as the headquarters of the Main Commissariat of Austro-Hungarian Army, and as the Main Postal Administration. After the capitulation of the Kingdom of Yugoslavia in 1941, the Ministry of Education was closed for a short time, but the Department for German Language Teaching was founded and it remained in the building until October 1944. The Church Department was separated from the Ministry in 1944 to form the Ministry of Religion. In November 1944, the Committee for the Education of the NR of Serbia was founded, and it grew into the Ministry of Education between April 1945–1946. It remained in the building until 1952, when the Federal Institute for the Patterns, and the Federal Institute for Work Productivity, moved into space vacated by the scaled-back newspaper Mladost and the ULUS, among others.

In 1988, two years after the first revitalization of the facade, the building was assigned to the Vuk Foundation for permanent use and management. The general reconstruction of the building was done in 1997/98. This included work on the ceiling of the hall, stairs and railings which were successfully reconstructed, and a modern chandelier was added to light the main hall. In 2006 the front facade facing the street was repaired. The Cultural Heritage Protection Institute of the City of Belgrade published a monograph in 1996, written by art historian Milojko Gordić, about the building using its monumental name as the title – The Ministry of Education Building.

== Preservation ==
The facade is completely preserved. The furniture, made after the designs of Dragutin Inkiostri, has been partially preserved and several pieces (e.g., a chair from the Minister's cabinet) are now in the Ethnographic Museum and the Museum of Applied Art in Belgrade. Most of the original compositions on the walls have been destroyed over time. However, the wall ornaments in the gateway towards the courtyard are original as they were accidentally painted over after the Second World War. They were discovered by accident in 1963, cleaned, and the allegoric compositions of religion, education, history and art can be seen on them. They were restored in 1997. Above the entrance to the building, the emblem of the Kingdom of Serbia was placed, embedded into the Art Nouveau shaped two-colored, red and white facade, with originally blended motifs from Serbian Medieval architecture, elements of Serbian national tradition, as well as the decorative motifs from the European secession. The purpose of this object, which is a testimony to the continuity of the culture of education, has been preserved for one hundred and thirty-five years.

The Ministry of Education Building was protected as the cultural property for the first time in 1966, and since 1979 it was declared cultural property of great importance (The Official Gazette SRS no. 14/79). The facade was revitalized in 2006, within the project "Lepša Srbija".

== Gallery ==
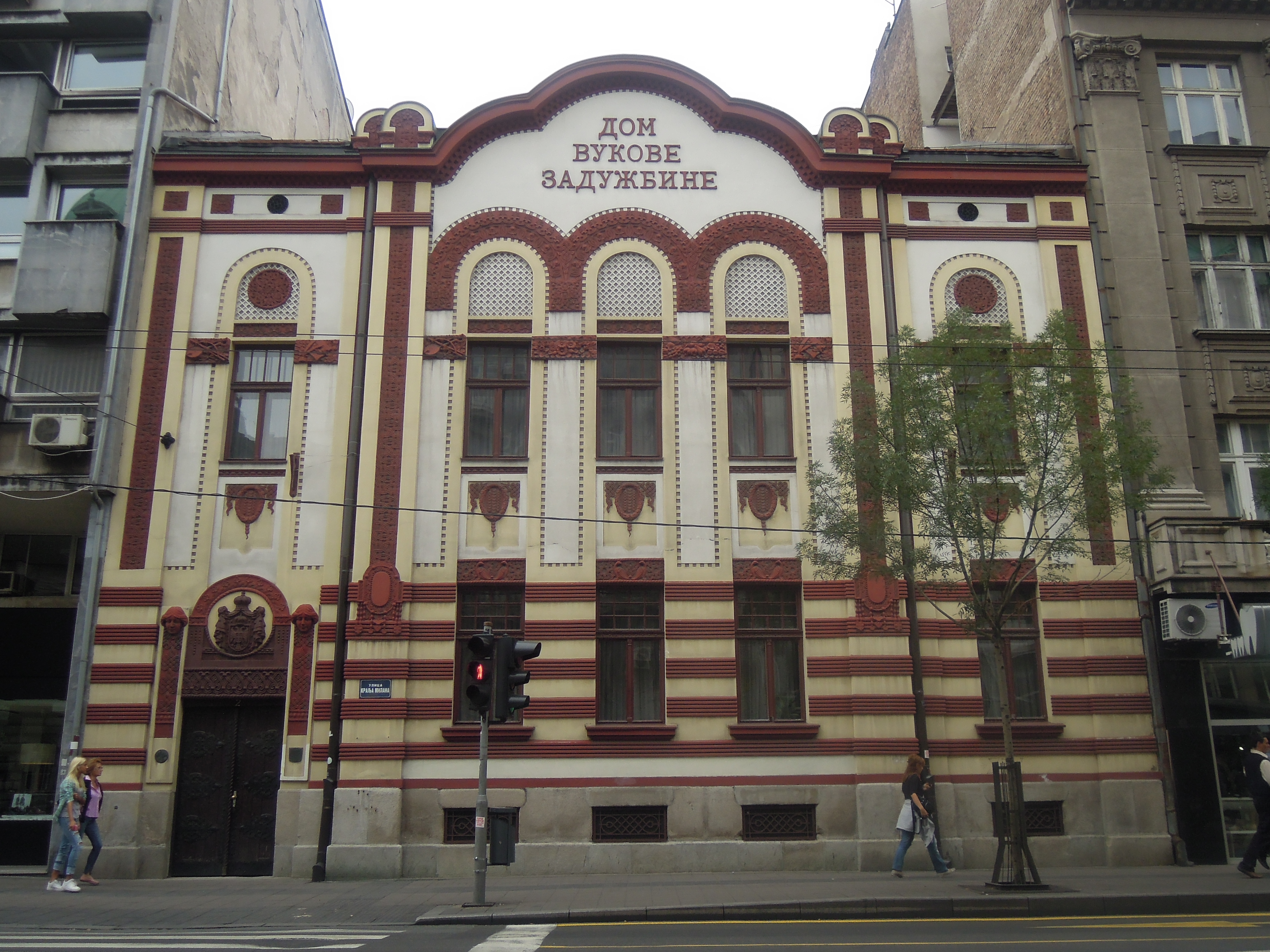

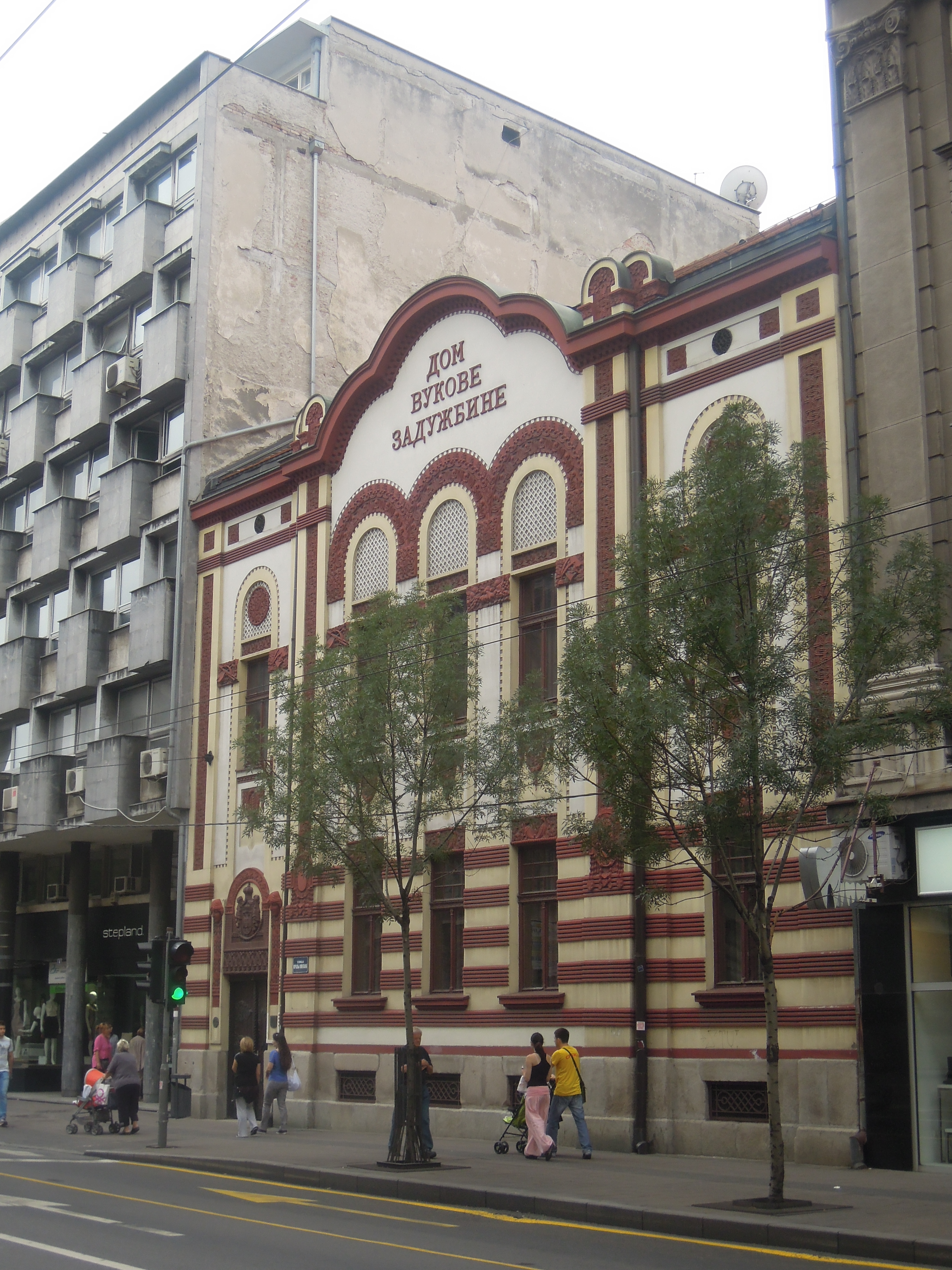

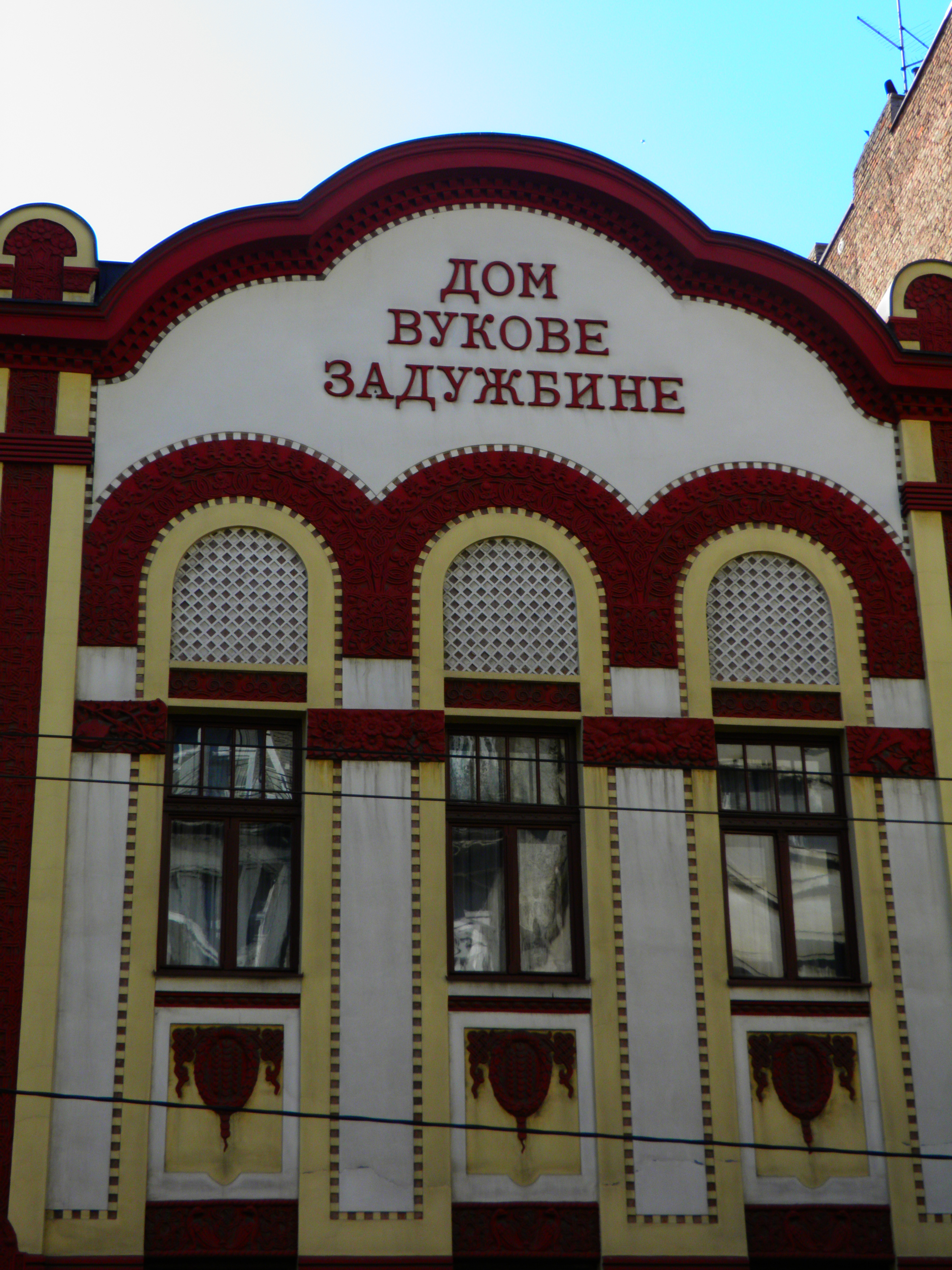

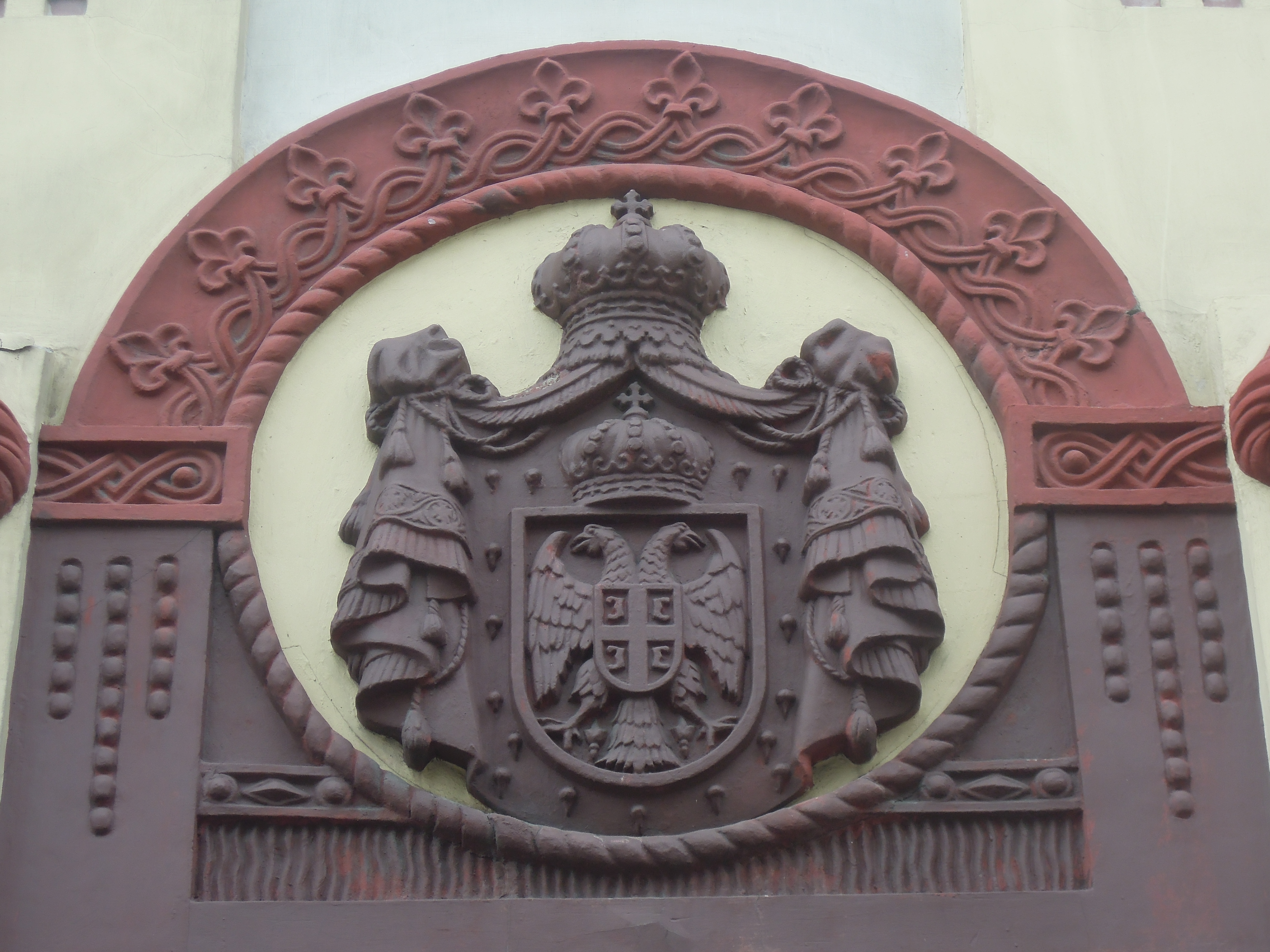

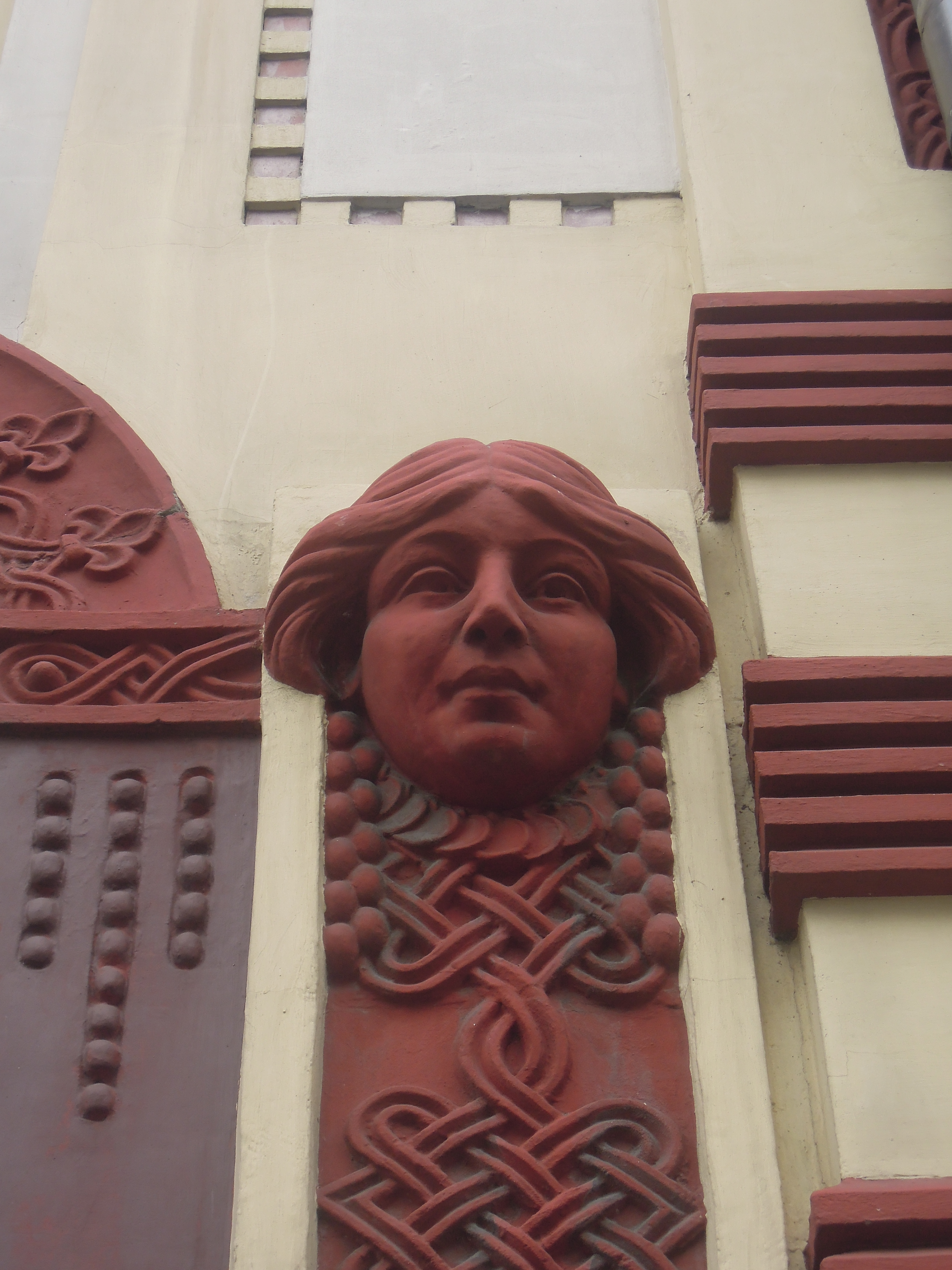

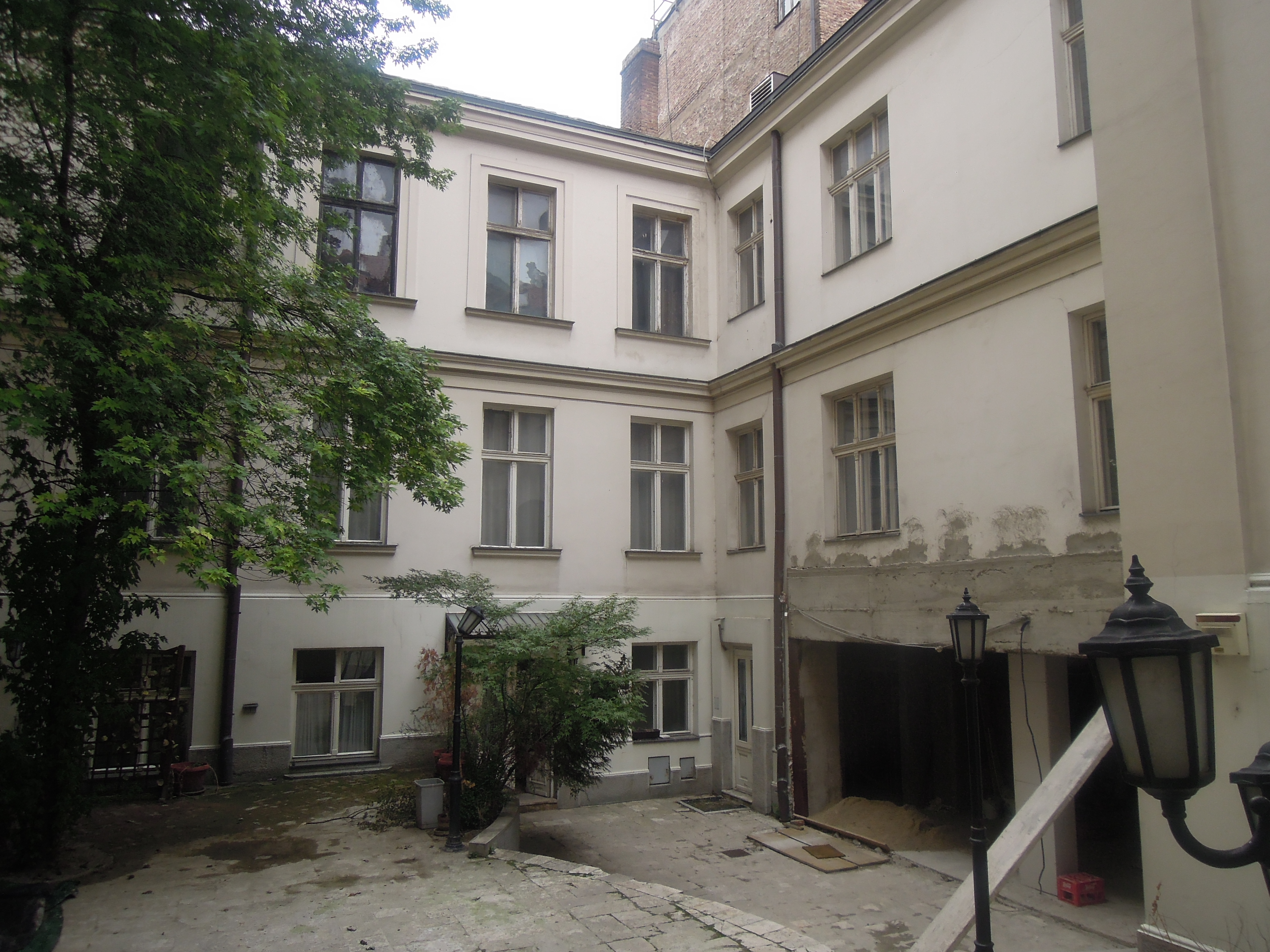

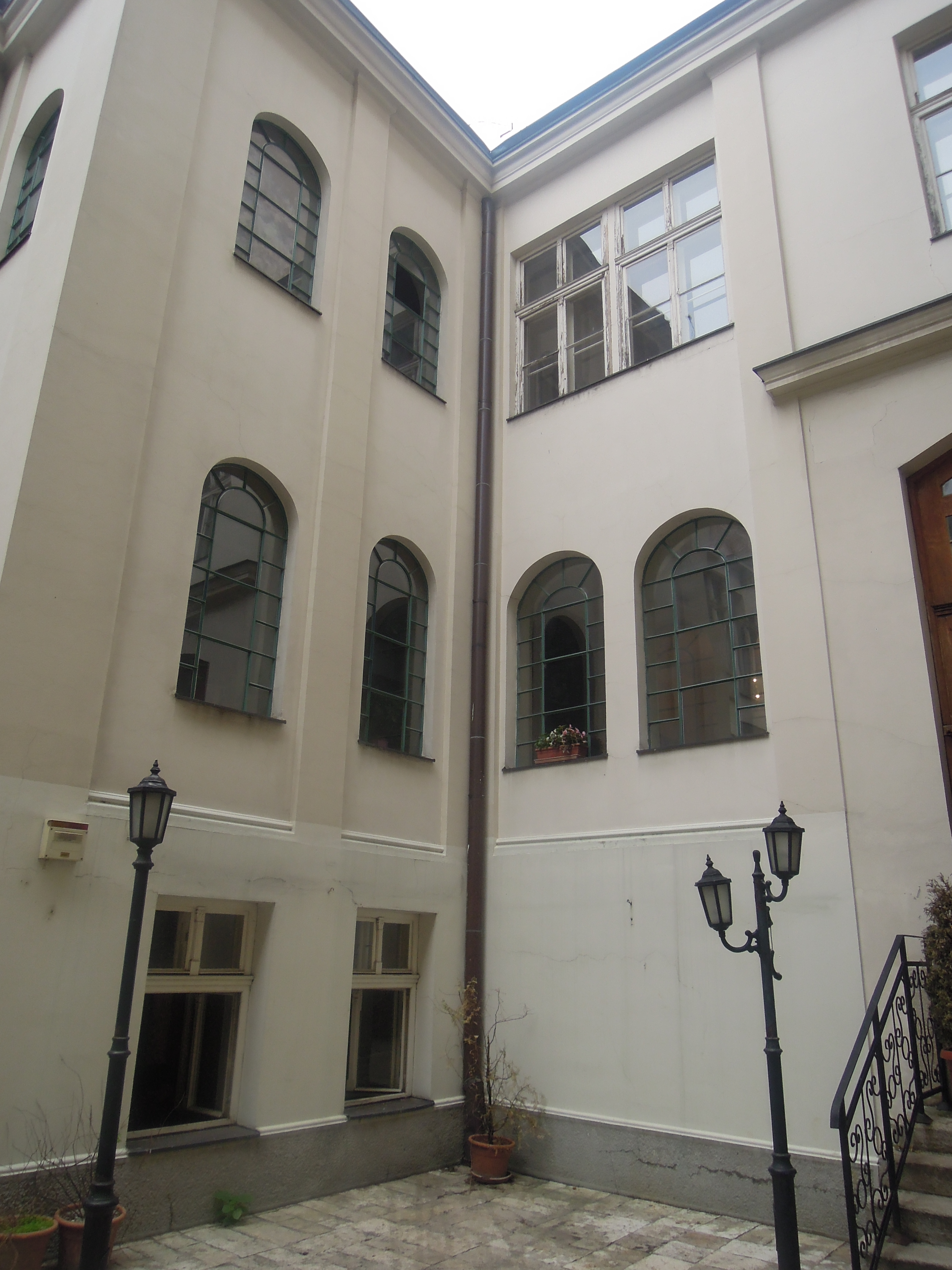

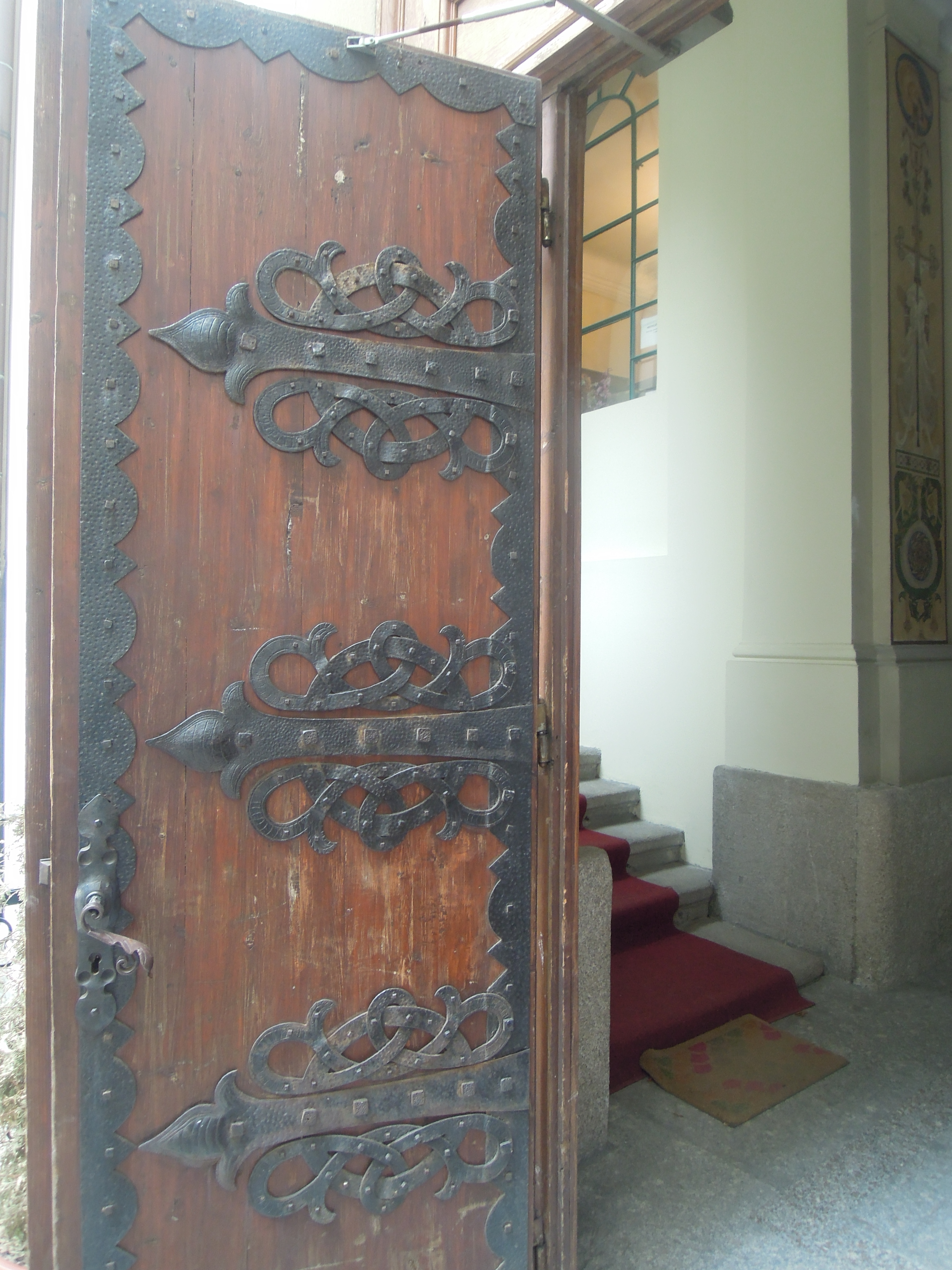

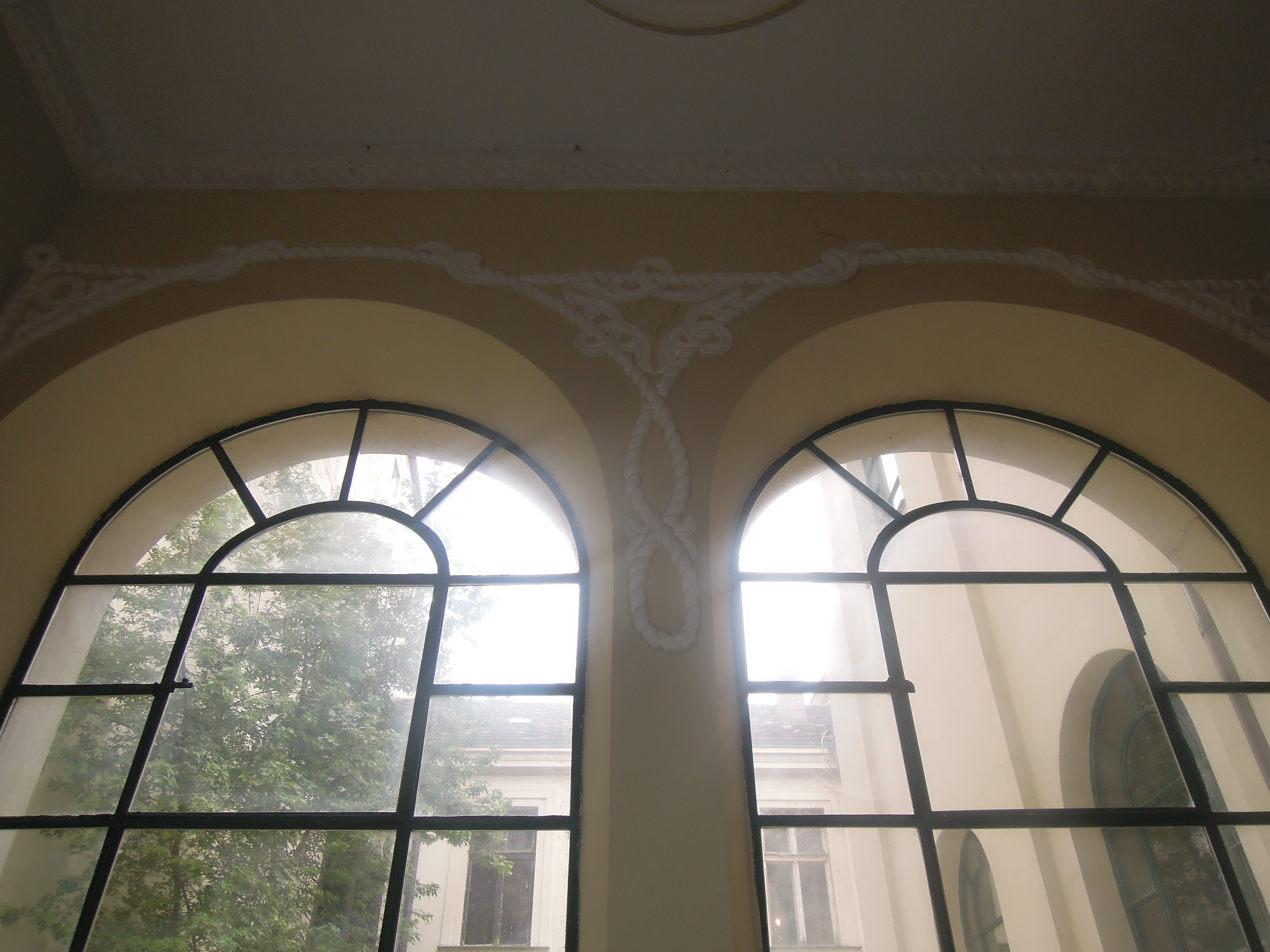

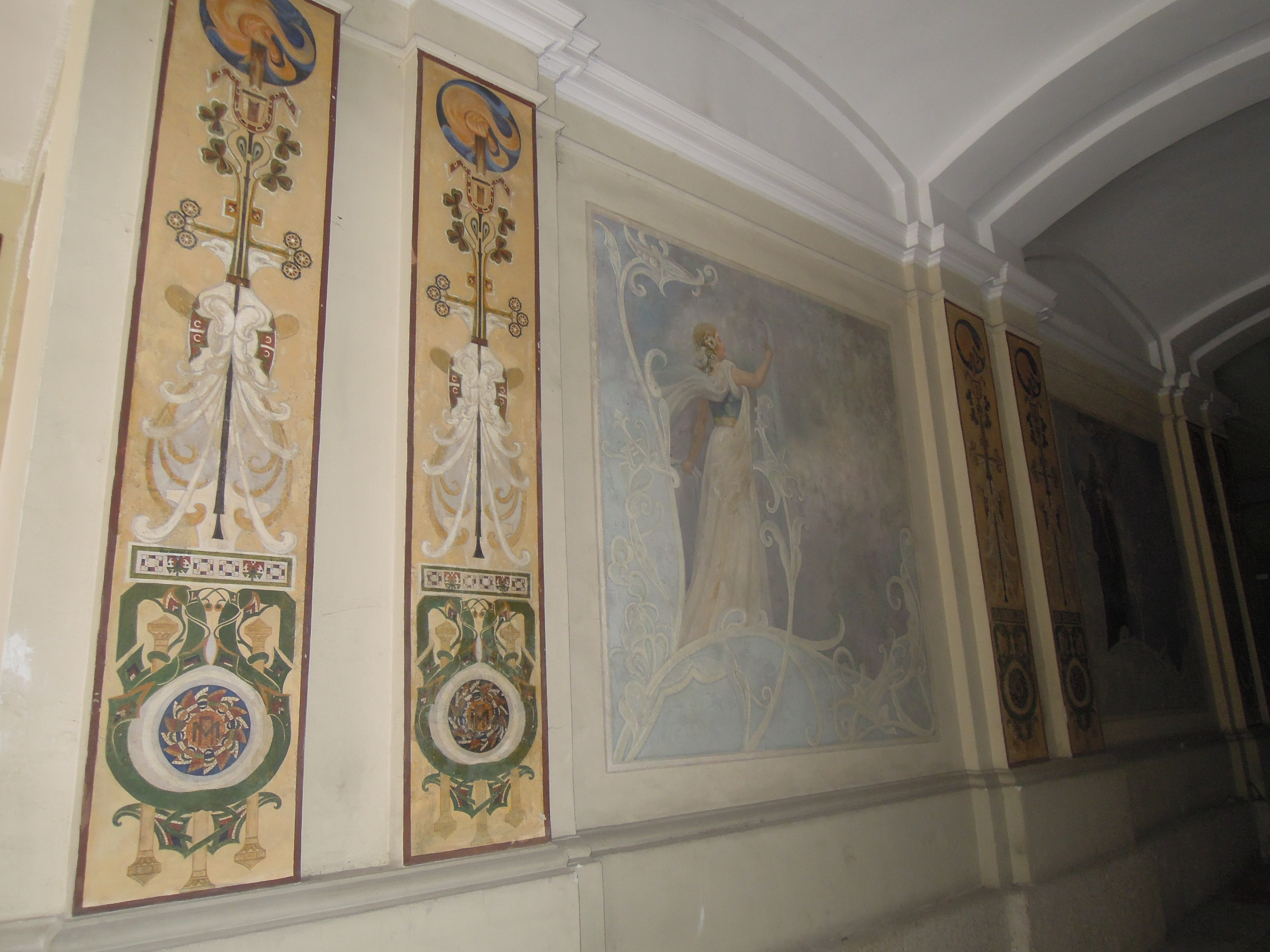

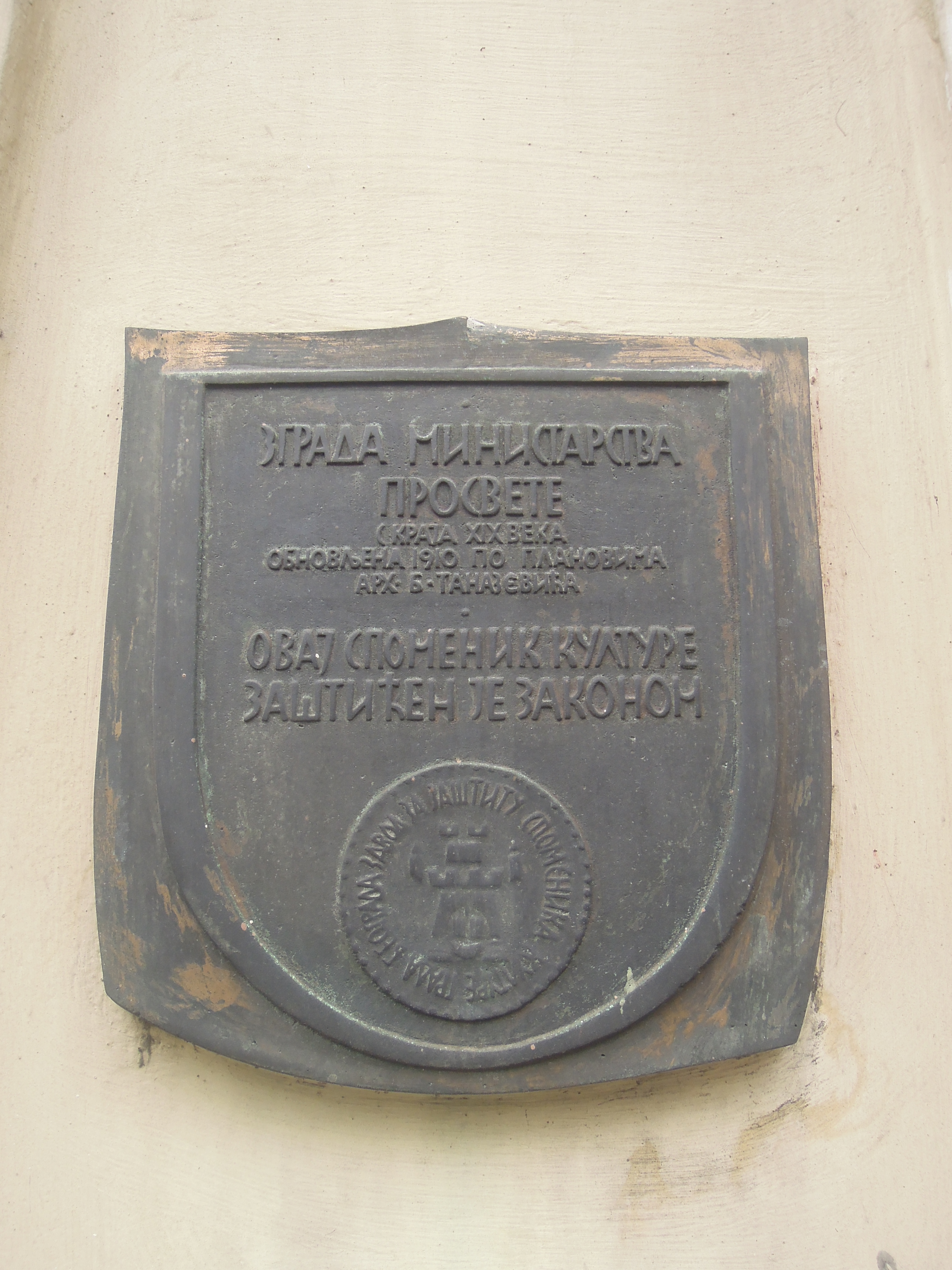
