= Monument to Jovan Cvijić =

Monument in Belgrade Serbia

Spomenik Jovanu Cvijiću u Univerzitetskom parku.jpg
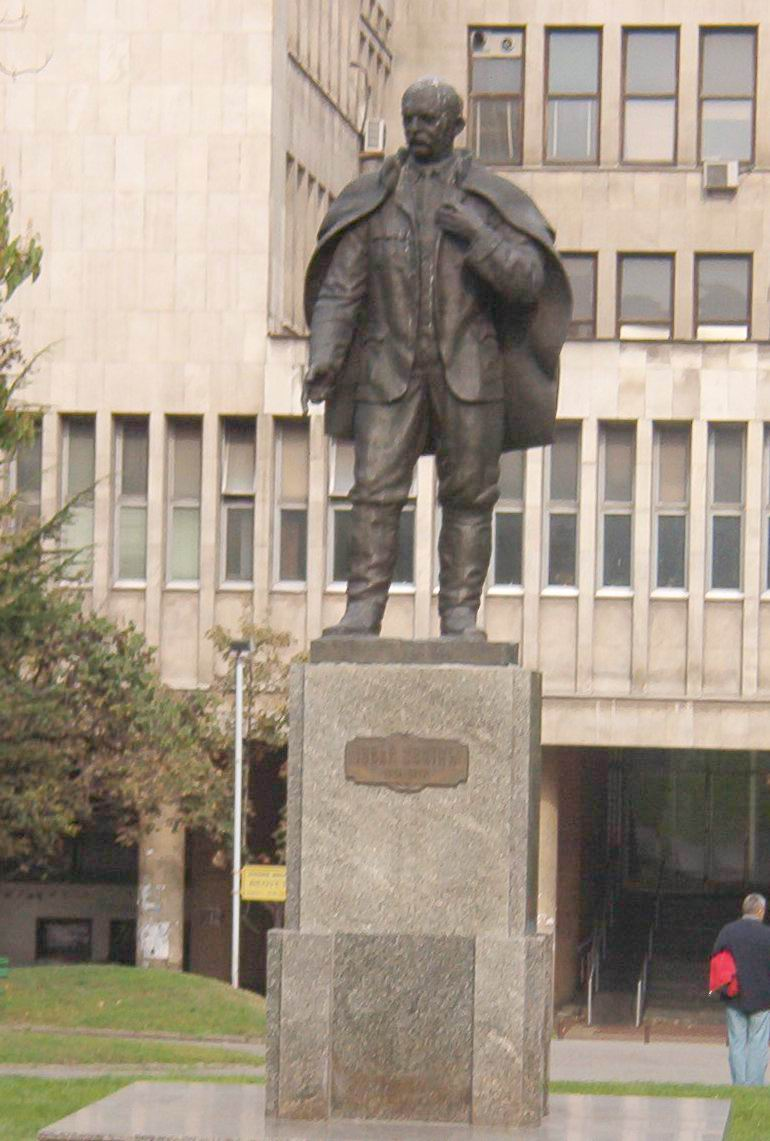
- Year: 1994
- Type: Monument
- Location: Belgrade; 44°49′10″N 20°27′29″E

The monument to Jovan Cvijić is a monument dedicated to Jovan Cvijić in Belgrade, Serbia, located in the Academy Park in the neighborhood of the University of Belgrade.

== Site ==
The area around Students' Park from the mid-18th century appears as the urban rectangular shape which served as the Turkish cemetery. In 1824, on one part of this already neglected cemetery the "Great Market" was opened, which existed until 1927.

The creation of Students' Park in its present form was done in 1927, after the design of the architect and the town planner Đorđe Kovaljevski. Later on, in 1929, the fence was erected around the park after the project of the architect Мilutin Borisavljević . The fence is conceived representatively with two ceremonial gates and the fence is ornamented with decorative vases. The park and the fence are in the style of Academism, with accentuated central longitudinal passage and roundels. The special value of the park lies in the representative public monuments dedicated to the greatest names of Serbian science and enlightenment, set up within the roundels on the longitudinal central line of the park. The monument to Dositej Obradović, еrected in 1930, was the work of Rudolf Valdec. The monument to Јоsif Pančić, a prominent Serbian scientist, was erected in 1994. The setting up free-standing sculptures within the public place is a characteristic of the academic concept of dealing with park areas.

== Monument ==
After the suggestion of the Assembly of the University of Belgrade, addressed to the City Assembly of Belgrade, in 1989 there was the initiative for the erection of a monument to Јоvan Cvijić in Students' Park. The sculpture is the work of the academic sculptor Отo Logo, the author of numerous works, out of which 32 were realized as the public monuments. The monument was unveiled on 9 November 1994, and at the ceremony organized on that occasion, the audience was addressed by the mayor of Belgrade, Nebojša Čović, and by Dejan Меdaković, the president of the SASA. The pedestal of the monument to Јоvan Cvijić was made of grey marble formwork, in the shape of a cube, with the simple profiles. The standing sculpture of the scientist in a dynamic and rhetorical attitude was set up on the pedestal. The monument was made in the style of portrait realism. The monument to Јоvan Cvijić possesses artistic value as a work of an important author, as well as historical and cultural value as a testimony to a prominent person from national history.
