= Aleksandar Bugarski =

Serbian architect

Aleksandar Bugarski (1835–1891) was a Serbian architect who combined the new with the old styles giving the city a distinct feature of its own.

== Biography ==
Aleksandar Bugarski was born in 1835 into an engineering family, in Eperjes (then Austrian Empire, today Prešov in Slovakia). His father Jovan moved to Serbia soon after his birth and in 1842 took Serbian citizenship, but after the change of dynasty, he moved from Belgrade to Novi Sad, where Aleksandar finished elementary school and high school. Then, he enrolled at the Budapest Technical College where he studied architecture.

From 1859 he opened his own architectural firm, and in the period from 1869 until 1890, he was employed by the Serbian Ministry of Construction and Public Works in Belgrade as a state architect. He worked in the countries of Austria-Hungary and in Serbia. He designed and erected the largest number of buildings in Belgrade: the initial design of the National Theatre 1869-1870, the Old Palace 1881-1884, now the seat of the Assembly of the City of Belgrade, some 126 public and private buildings, then Dom društva Crvenog krsta (the House of the Red Cross), the Delini pharmacy on Zeleni venac, the building of the former Ministry of Education, today's House of Vuk's Foundation. Outside Belgrade, he designed churches in Loznica in 1871 and Ritopek in 1872-1873, and abroad the Bauer Hotel in Bad Ischl and Wertheim's workers houses in Vienna. He was also involved in horticulture as a landscape architect: his work, along with others (he followed Emilijan Josimović's far-reaching original, early urban plan), is the urban park in Belgrade known as simply Kalemegdan. Bugarski died in Belgrade, Kingdom of Serbia on 11 August 1891.

He is a typical representative of historical styles from the Renaissance to Neoclassicism combined with traditional Serbian architecture and art of the medieval past. Bugarski was the most important architect, if not, one of the most important of his time in Serbia.

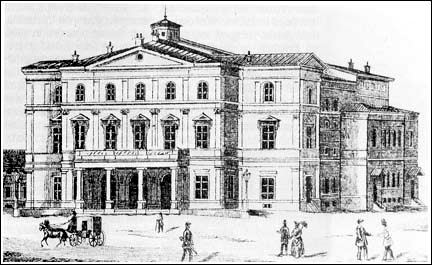
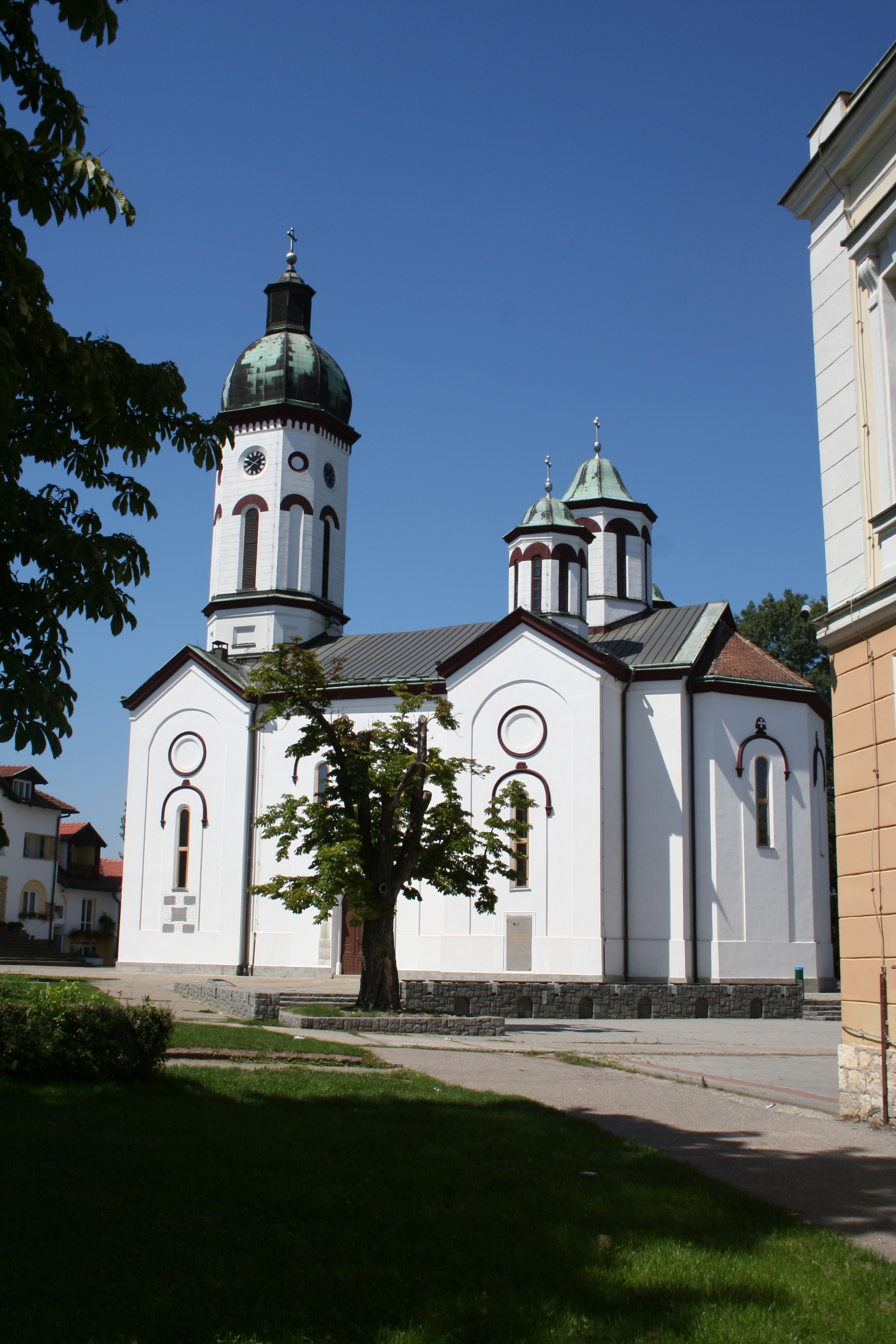
Old National Theatre Serbian Orthodox Church in Loznica

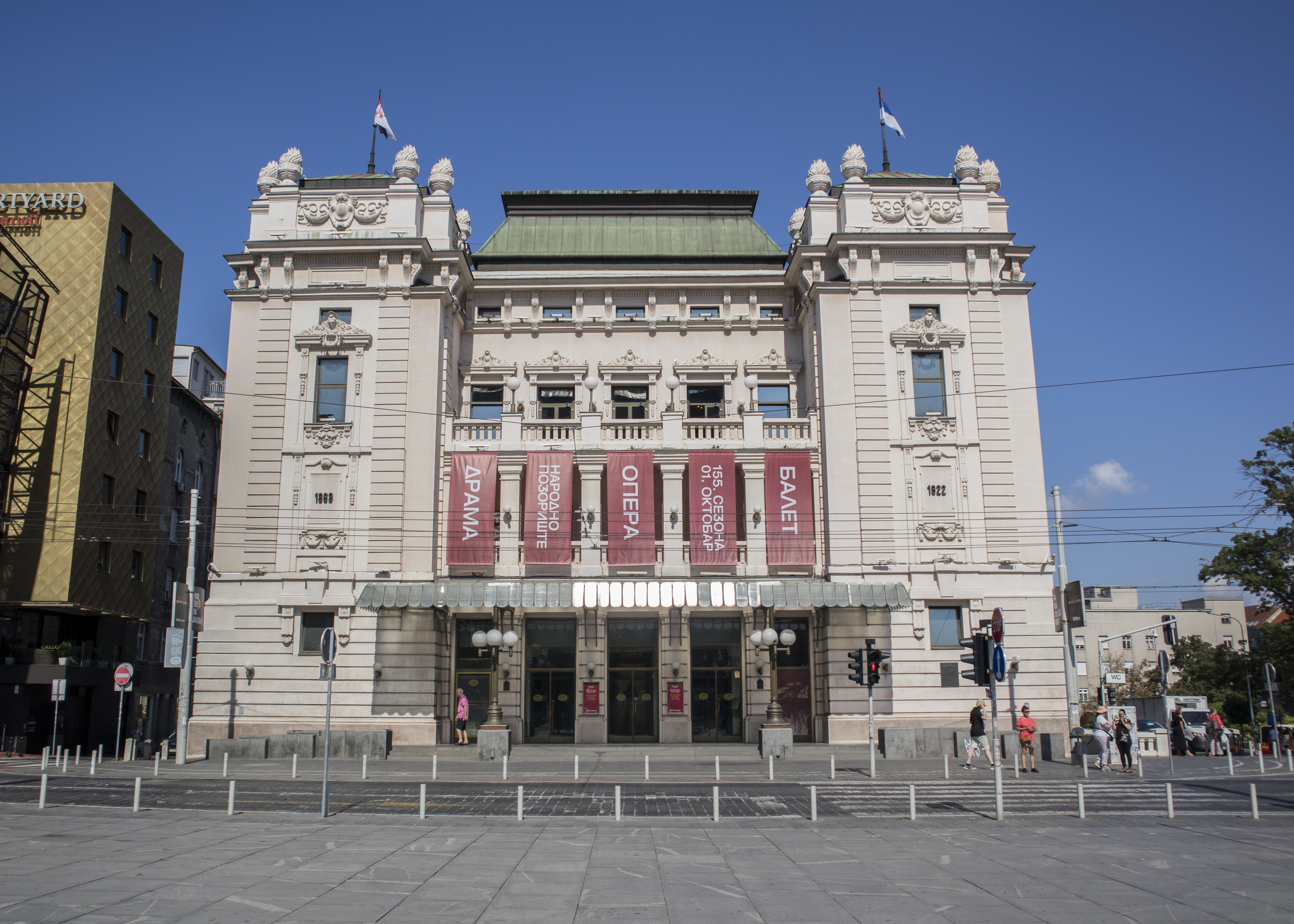
National Theatre in Belgrade

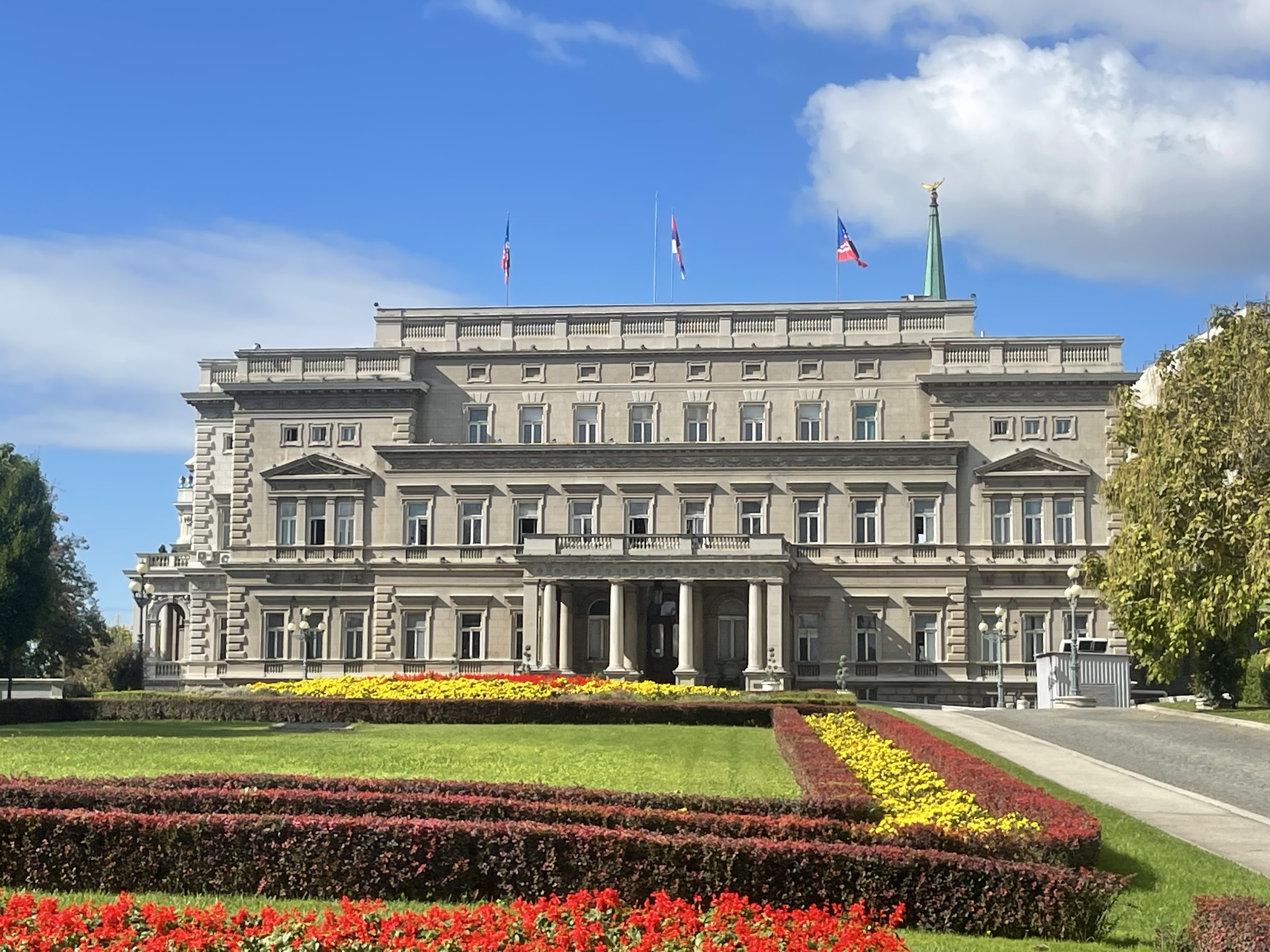
Stari dvor in Belgrade

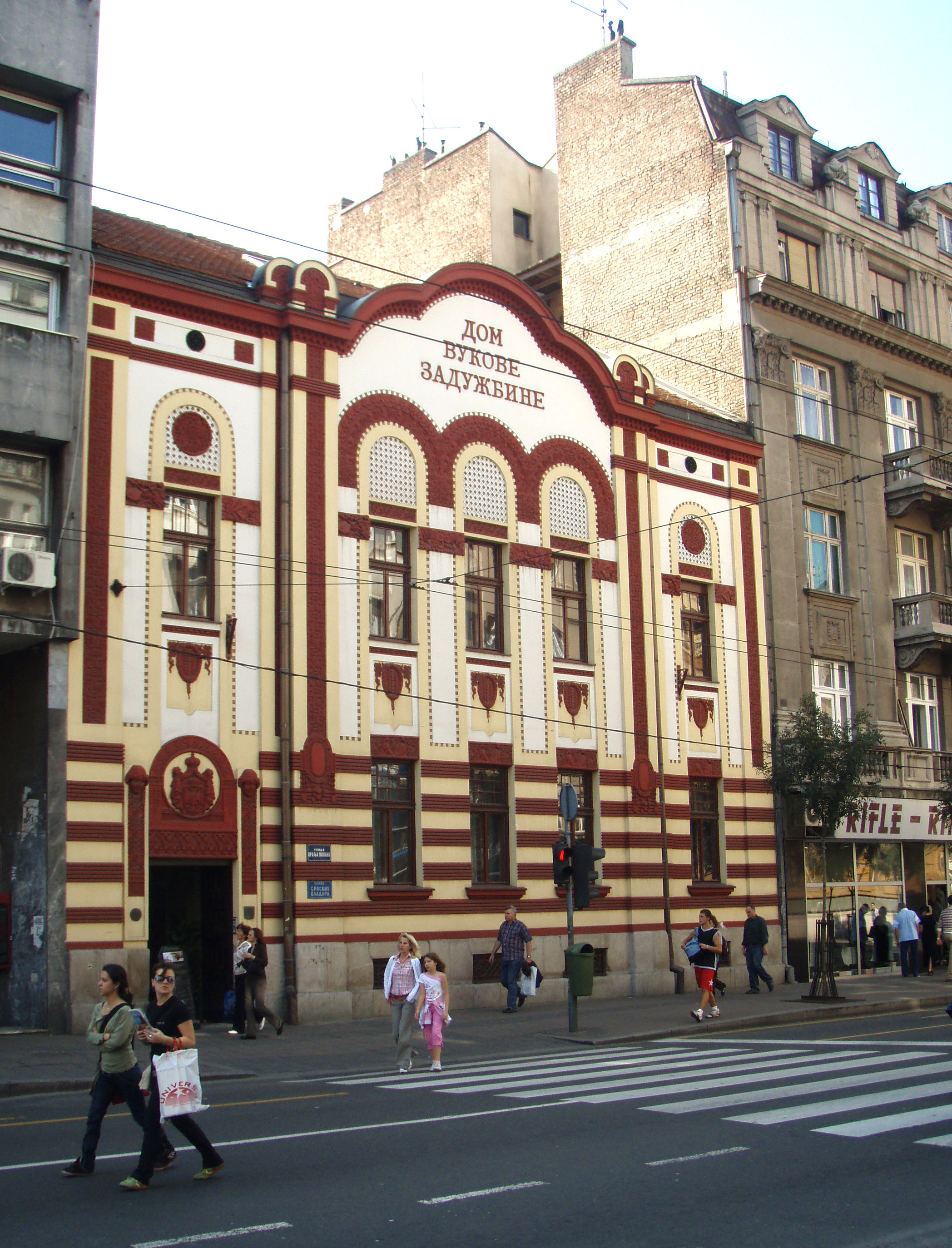
Vuk Foundation House in Belgrade

Smederevo, town hall
