= Rakovac (Novi Pazar) =

Coordinates: 43°12′N 20°20′E

Rakovac Раковац
- Village (Selo)
- Interactive map of Rakovac
- Country: Serbia
- Elevation: 3,579 ft (1,091 m)
- Time zone: UTC+1 (CET)
  - Summer (DST): UTC+2 (CEST)

Rakovac is a village in Novi Pazar municipality in Serbia.
