= Dragutin Inkiostri Medenjak =

Serbian painter (1866–1942)

Dragutin Inkiostri Medenjak Драгутин Инкиостри Медењак
- Born: Carlo Inkiostri; Карло Инкиостри; 18 October 1866; Split, Austrian Empire
- Died: 16 September 1942 (aged 75); Belgrade, German-occupied Serbia
- Known for: Painting

Dragutin Inkiostri-Medenjak (Serbian Cyrillic: Драгутин Инкиостри Медењак; 1866–1942) was a Serbian painter, collector of folk ornaments and handicrafts, and is considered the first interior designer in Serbia. In 1912, he was put in charge of designing the interior of the House of Vuk's Foundation.

He was born in Split as Carlo Inchiostri. After settling down in Belgrade, he changed his name to Dragutin and added his mother's surname. Following studies in Florence, he travelled through Serbia and the rest of Yugoslavia. Inchiostri Medenjak wrote his chief work Moja teorija o dekorativnoj srpskoj umetnosti i njenoj primeni in 1925.

== Gallery ==
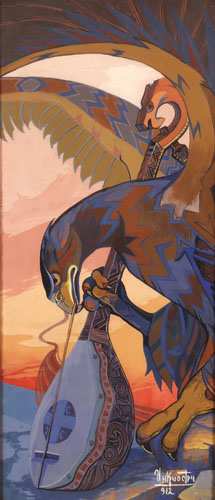
Orao i gusle ("Eagle and Gusle"), 1912

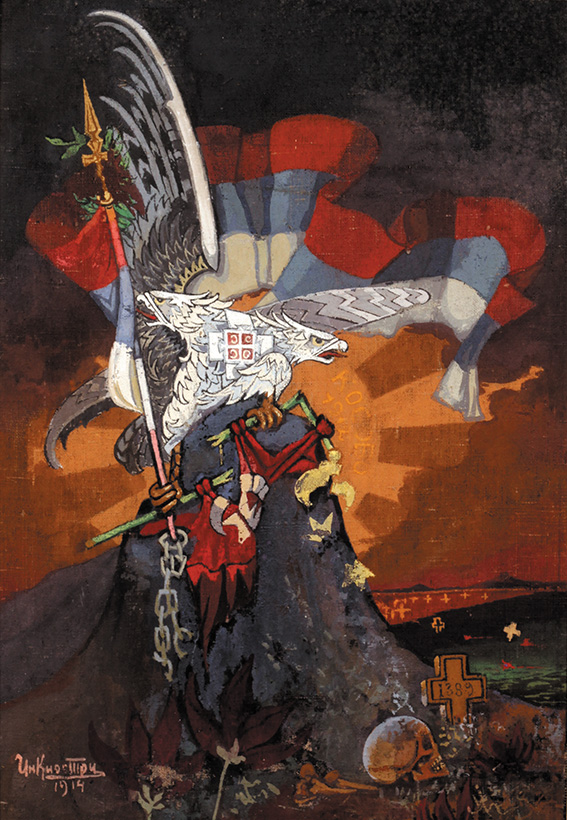
Osvećeno Kosovo ("Sanctified Kosovo"), 1914. Privatno vlasništvo. Umetnička zbirka porodice Popović, Novi Sad.

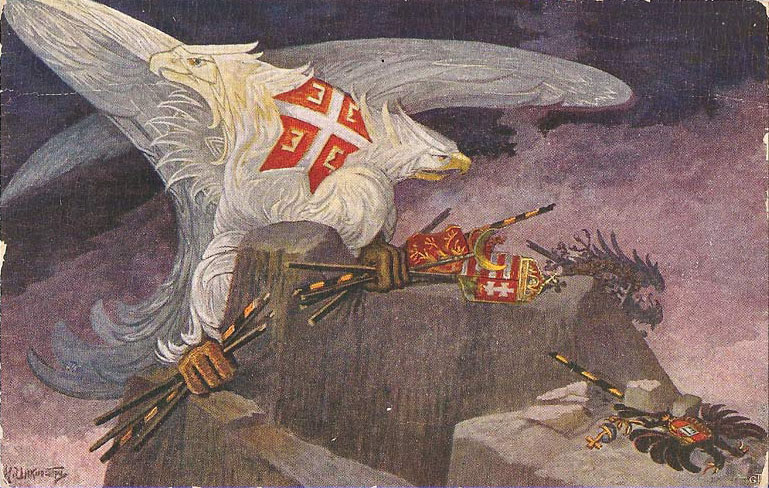
Bijeli Orao ("White Eagle"), 1922

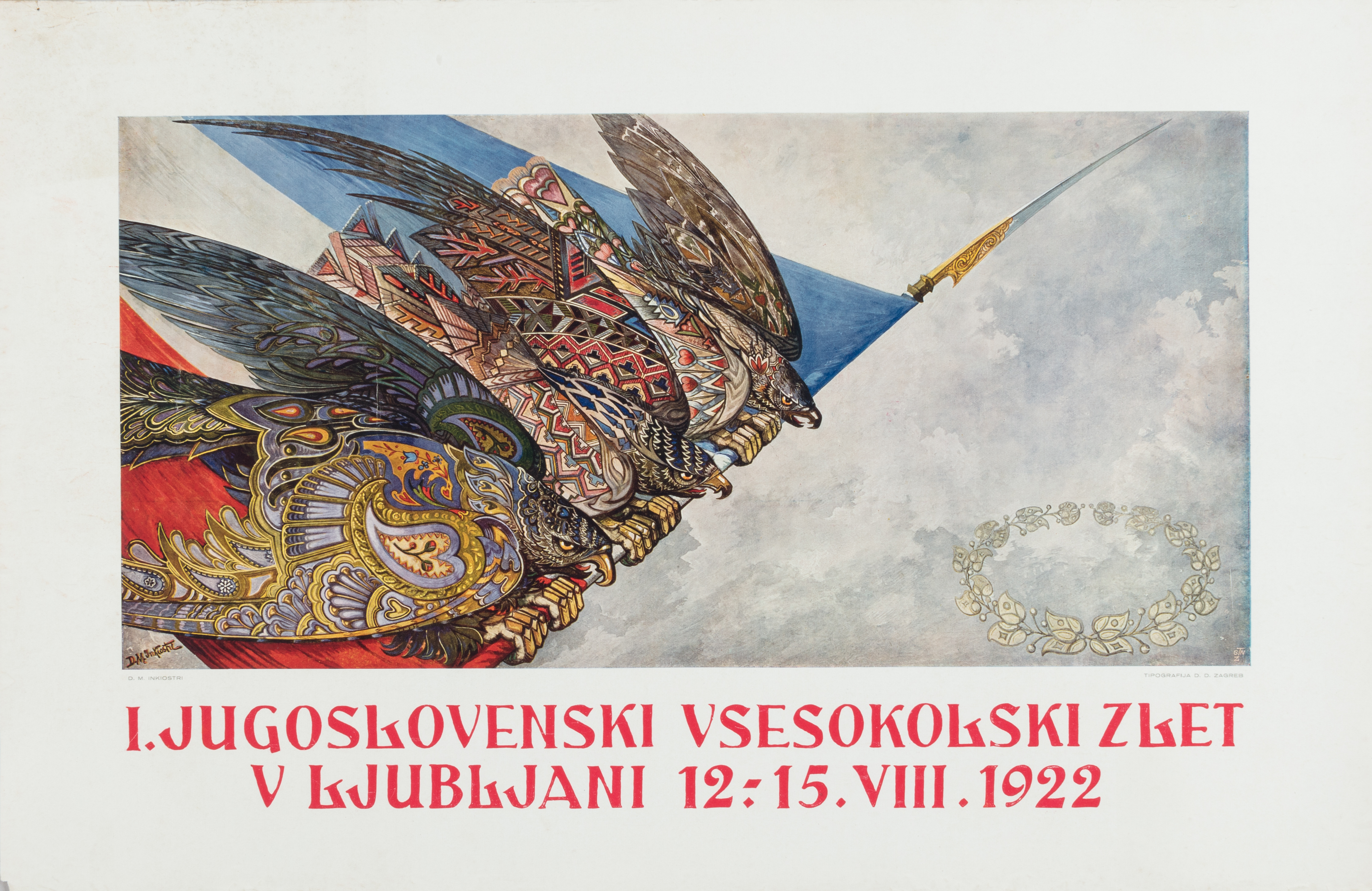
I. Jugoslovanski vsesokolski zlet v Ljubljani ("First Yugoslav all-Sokol slet in Ljubljana"), 1922

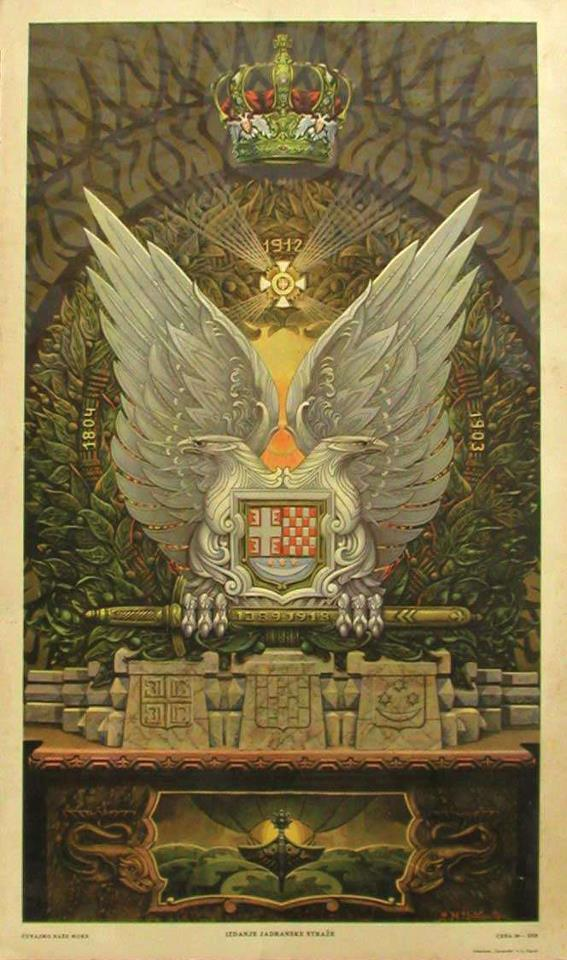
"Jadranska straža" (Adriatic guard), 1930

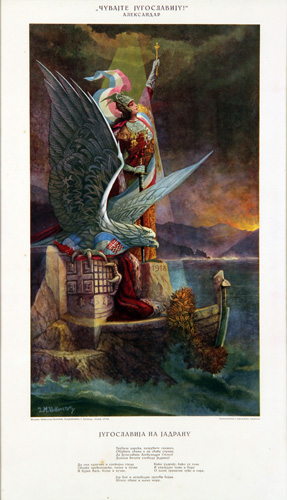
Jugoslavija na Jadranu ("Yugoslavia at the Adriatic"), 1935

== See also ==
- List of painters from Serbia
