= Savamala =

Urban neighbourhood in Belgrade, Serbia

Savamala Савамала
- Urban neighbourhood
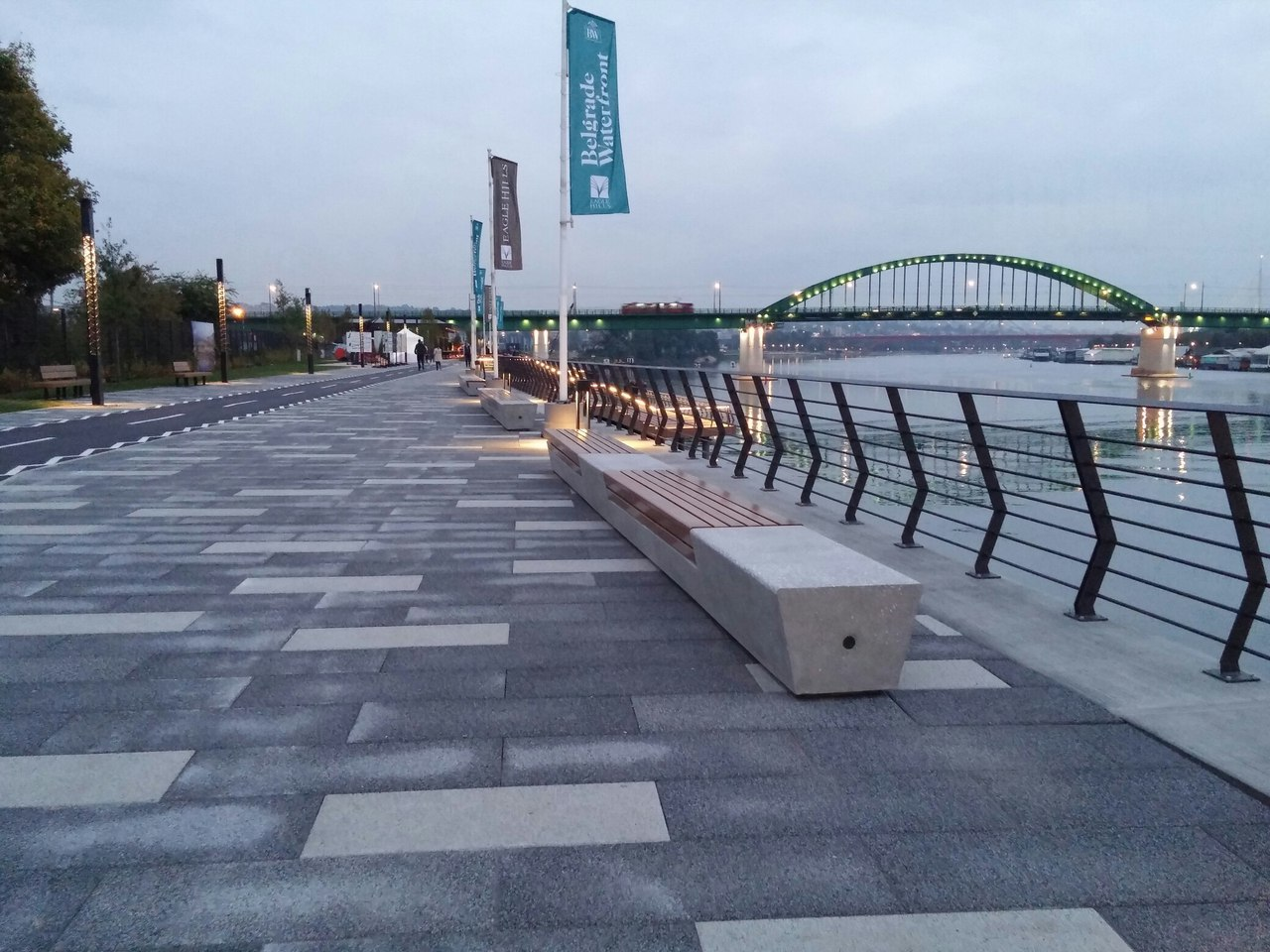
- Savamala and new Sava Promenade

- Location within Belgrade
- Coordinates: 44°48′48.6″N 20°27′08.3″E
- Country: Serbia
- Region: Belgrade
- Municipality: Savski Venac/Stari Grad

Population (2011)
  - Total: 18,950
- Time zone: UTC+1 (CET)
  - Summer (DST): UTC+2 (CEST)
- Area code: +381(0)11
- Car plates: BG

Savamala (Serbian Cyrillic: Савамала) is an urban neighborhood of Belgrade, the capital of Serbia. It is located in Belgrade's municipalities of Savski Venac and Stari Grad.

== Location ==
Savamala is located south of the Kalemegdan fortress and the neighborhood of Kosančićev Venac, and stretches along the right bank of the Sava river. Its northern section belongs to the municipality of Stari Grad, while central and southern sections belong to the municipality of Savski Venac. The central street in the neighborhood is Karađorđeva.

Originally, the entire western section (Terazije slopes) of today's city center was called Savamala, roughly bounded by the modern streets and squares of Terazije, King Milan's, Slavija, Nemanjina and Prince Miloš's. The entire area was known as Zapadni Vračar, but that name completely disappeared from usage, while as Savamala today is considered only a section along the Karađorđeva street.

Today, the zone of "preventive protection Savamala" is bounded by the streets: Brankova, Kraljice Natalije, Dobrinjska, Admirala Geprata, Balkanska, Hajduk Veljkov venac, Sarajevska, Vojvode Milenka, Savska, Karađorđeva, Zemunski put and the Branko's bridge. That means it encompasses the neighborhoods of Zeleni Venac and Terazijska Terasa.

== History ==
=== 17th century ===
On his voyage from Constantinople to London, English traveler Peter Mundy visited Belgrade in 1620. He noted that the bank of the Sava below Belgrade was filled with gristmills and counted 35 of them. Mundy described the watermills as "nice looking", both inside and outside. They appeared as regular houses, except for the boat-shaped bows. Windmills were placed on large barges. The ropes which tied them to the bank were made of intertwined wicker, while the buckets filled with stones served as anchors. The barges were aptly made from dressed timber held together only by wooden stakes, without any iron parts. Next to the barges were small boats which held the other side of the axle which was spinning the mill wheel. The watermills were constructed in the interior and then rafted downstream to Belgrade.

=== 18th century ===
First inhabitants were settled in the early 18th century, during the 1717-1739 Austrian occupation of northern Serbia, when Austrians moved Christian population out of the Belgrade Fortress. In this period, Belgrade was divided by the governing Austrian authorities on 6 districts: Fortress, (Upper) Serbian Town (modern Kosančićev Venac), German Town (modern Dorćol), Lower Serbian Town (Savamala), Karlstadt (Palilula) and the Great Military Hospital (Terazije-Tašmajdan). Central street in the settlement was the Tefderdarska Street, after the Tefder Mosque. In the early 20th century, with several other streets, it will be transformed into the Karađorđeva Street, which remains the central thoroughfare of the modern neighborhood. Several distinct neighborhoods developed in Lower Serbian Town, with names like "Preka Mahala", section "Kraj Save" ("at Sava", where the poorest population dwelled) or "Pokraj Bare" ("next to the pond"), where the boatmen and street musicians resided.

The area was originally a bog called Ciganska bara (Serbian for "Gypsy pond"). The bog was charted for the first time in an Austrian map from 1789. It was a marsh which covered a wide area from modern Karađorđeva street to the mouth of the Topčiderska Reka into the Sava, across the northern tip of Ada Ciganlija. Marshy area covered modern location of the Belgrade Main railway station and parts of the Sarajevska and Hajduk-Veljkov venac streets. Ciganska bara drained two other bogs. One was located on Slavija, which drained through the creek which flew down the area of the modern Nemanjina street. Other pond whose water drained into the Ciganska bara was Zeleni Venac. Romanies who lived in the area, used the mud from the bog to make roof tiles. They lived in small huts or caravans (called "čerge"), between the high grass and rush, with their horses and water buffaloes grazing freely in the area. As most of the huts were actually stilt houses, built on piles due to the marshy land, the area was gradually named Bara Venecija ("Venice pond"). By 1884 the bog was drained and buried under the rubble from all parts of the city and especially from Prokop, because of the construction of the Belgrade Main railway station.

=== 19th century ===
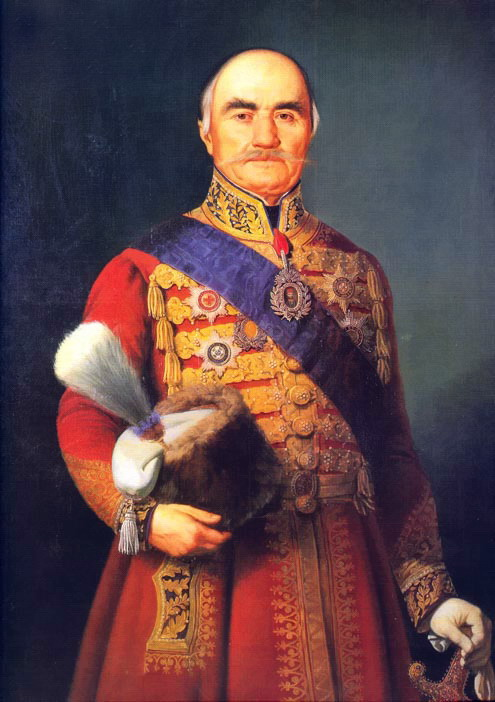
Prince Miloš Obrenović ordered the construction of modern Savamala in 1834

Road to the Sava Gate passed through this area, which was one of the gates for entering the Belgrade Fortress. During the First Serbian Uprising, through this gate Karađorđe, the leader of the uprising, entered Belgrade, liberated from the Ottomans in December 1806. The gate, also called Šabac Gate, was located where the Velike Stepenice ("Great Stairs") descended into Savamala. The troops were headed by Konda Bimbaša and they stormed into the fortress on 12 December 1806. In January 1807, Austrian and French press reported on the raid, which was the first international mention of Savamala.

When the Ottomans regained Belgrade in October 1813, their vanguards burned wooden hovels in Savamala, engulfing the city in smoke. When the main Ottoman army landed, a large number of Serbs got stranded on the bank in Savamala, trying to flee across the river into Austria. Men were massacred, while women and children were enslaved. All over the city heads on a spike appeared, and people were impaled on stakes along all city roads. When Ottoman Grand Vizier Hurshid Pasha arrived in Belgrade, he declared the full amnesty. However, he soon left, and Sulejman Pasha Skopljak took over Belgrade, even intensifying the terror. He issued an order that "people of Savamala can rebuild their houses, but of such size, that man has to stoop when entering". Things changed only in 1815 when Marashli Ali Pasha arrived in Belgrade.

Marashli Ali Pasha, Ottoman vizier of Belgrade from 1815 to 1821, in 1817 by the verbal agreement donated the entire patch of land along the river, stretching from the Fortress to the modern Mostar interchange to Serbian ruling prince Miloš Obrenović. The area was known as Savska Jalija (Sava bank in Turkish). It included tumbledown houses of the boatmen, taverns and the Emperor (or Sherif) Mosque. The pasha gave the land to prince as the spahiluk, which means that the prince wasn't the owner, but had right to collect rent.

Savamala was the first new settlement constructed outside the fortress walls. In time, migrants from Bulgaria and Hungary also settled in the neighborhood, so as the boatmen from Bosnia who operated river trade. The settlement was separated from the central city area by the trench, which had embankment and palisade. The structure was maintained by the residents through the corvée. The palisades were removed in 1827, and the poor used it as firewood. The only survived part of the fortification was the Sava Gate. In the late 1820s, a popular Cannoneer's Greenmarket (Tobdžijska pijaca) was established, when Prince Miloš partially resettled inhabitants of Savamala to Palilula. It was located where the park on Hajduk Veljkov Venac is today, above the Savska Jalija. A building of the Ministry of Transportation was later built next to it. For the most part it had no permanent market stalls and the goods were sold directly of the carts.

Construction began in the 1830s as ordered by the prince Miloš Obrenović, after a popular pressure to build a Serbian settlement outside the fortress and the Turkish settlement. Prince Miloš ordered for the entire Savamala population to be relocated to the village of Palilula, outside of the city. The order was issued on 13 February 1834 and Cvetko Rajović was appointed to oversee it. The residents refused to move. Irritated by the dragging on of his project, the prince gathered his henchmen and thugs and sent them to Savamala in 1835. As the settlement was still just a shanty town, with houses made of rotten wood and mud, all the houses were demolished in one day, without any demolition equipment. The demolished neighborhood was then burned to the ground, either on the order of the prince, or on the request of the residents so that they wouldn't have to pay for the clearing of the locality.

Prince Miloš relocated the city's port from the Danube to the Sava river and the customs house, called Đumrukana was built around 1835. The prince issued a decree that "merchants and trade agents must settle along the Sava". Rajović tried to hire Joseph Felber, an architect from Zemun, to design the new neighborhood, but he failed, and Nikola Živković, known as Hadži-Neimar, took over. Next to the Đumrukana, the Consulate Building was built. All consuls residing in Belgrade at the time were seated there. The 60 m (200 ft) elongated building later became Hotel Kragujevac. Both buildings domineered the scenic view of the neighborhood seen from the river, towered by the tall Cathedral Church above, in Kosančićev Venac. Both buildings were damaged in World War II and demolished after the war. On 12 June 1841, the first steamboat ever in Serbia docked in Sava port. It was Count István Széchenyi's ship Erzherzog Ludwig, who ported to visit Prince Miloš and Belgrade's Ottoman pasha. It was the main event in the city, with a "ton of people flocking down at the Sava". Even members of pasha's harem came down to the river. Count Széchenyi allowed for some of the spectators to visit and inspect the ship.

By 1841, when Đumrukana was adapted into the first regular theatre house in Belgrade, the commerce blossomed and the "Kovačević Han" was built where the modern Hotel Bristol is. "Beogradski mali pijac" (Belgrade's Little Farmers Market) was established at the center of Savamala and with the Karađorđeva street, became the focal point of city's commerce. The market was conceived by the prince as the proper Serbian farmers market (upper Cannoneer's Greenmarket was not regulated), as opposed to the Great Market in downtown where the majority of sellers were Turks. Founded in 1834, it was located between the modern buildings of Hotel Bristol and Belgrade Cooperative. Little market was only the wholesale market, receiving goods mostly via the rivers, from the regions of Syrmia and Mačva. Main goods included grains, beans, prunes, leather, plum pekmez, etc. The goods were then transported to downtown and sold to the consumers at the Great Market. As many goods arrived across the river, held by Austria at the time, the Little Market evolved into the city's major barter exchange.

Storages and shops were abundant and the most esteemed merchants in Belgrade began buying lots and building houses: the Krsmanović brothers, Rista Paranos, Konstantin Antul, Luka Ćelović and Đorđe Vučo. State financially supported the construction of 46 shops, administrative building of the State Council (future "Odeon" cinema), building of the Ministry of Finance with the Financial Park (since 2017 Park Gavrilo Princip) and the Asencion Church. The first foreign consulate in Belgrade was opened in Savamala. It is recorded that in 1854, at the Liman section of Savamala (where the pillars of the Branko's Bridge are today), a trading caravan arrived with 550 big and 105 small camels. It was the last camel caravan to reach Belgrade, bringing tobacco from town of Serres to Belgrade merchant Anastas Hiristodulo. By the late 19th century, a tram line connected the peer with the Slavija Square. The fortress' outer Sava Gate at the western end of the neighborhood was demolished in 1862.

The first avenue in Belgrade was planted in Savamala. It was planted from 1845 to 1850 along the Abadžijska Čaršija, modern Kraljice Natalije Street. It was the project of Atanasije Nikolić, educator and agriculturist, who developed seedlings in the nursery garden he established in Topčider. The trees were cut in 1889.

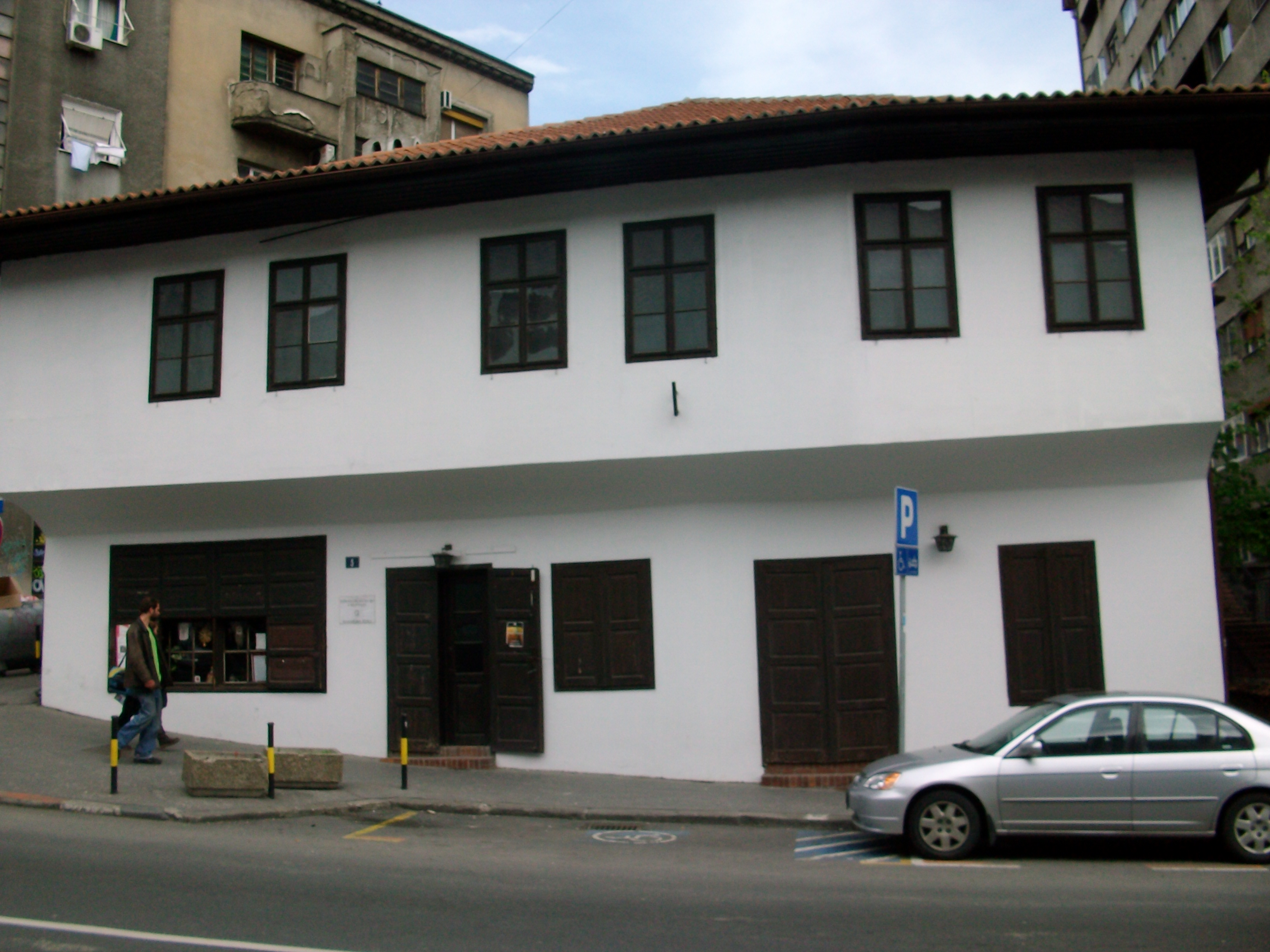
Manak's House, built in 1830, one of the oldest surviving houses in upper Savamala

Hadži-Neimar designed in 1840 an elongated, large, ground floor house, built from hard materials at the corner of modern Balkanska, Gavrila Principa and Admirala Geprata streets. It was called Princely or Great Brewery, or, because it was owned by princess Ljubica Obrenović, Ljubica's Brewery. It was the second brewery in Belgrade, after the Vajnhapl's Brewery from 1839, which precise location is unknown today (Vračar, Skadarlija). It also hosted kafana and large yard. The building later hosted the Saint Andrew's Day Assembly in 1858-1859 and served as the temporary theatrical scene from 1857 to 1862 after the demolition of Đumrukana. It was later acquired by the Vajfert family, until the building was demolished in 1935.

Interior minister Nikola Hristić ordered demolition of the Sava Gate in June 1862 during the Čukur Fountain incident with the Ottomans. Later that year, the remaining Ottomans from the Savamala, who lived in the area of Liman and around the Sherif Mosque. moved into the fortress, and the mosque, as the last remaining Ottoman object in the neighborhood, was demolished. Also in 1862, contractor Joseph Steinlechner was summoned by the prince to build the stairs ("Great Stairs"), which connected Savamala with Kosančičev Venac.

Merchant Rista Paranos purchased the "Kovačević Han" in 1867 and reconstructed it into the "Paranos Han". It was a city within the city, with shops, kafanas, rooms for rent, storages and stables. Next to it, a modern "Evropa" hotel was built. By 1862, economic output of Savamala overtook the economy in the old, "within the trench" section of Belgrade. That year, the marble cross dedicated the fallen soldier during the 1806 liberation of Belgrade from the Ottomans in the First Serbian Uprising was built at Little Market. It was built by the merchant Ćira Hristić. Popular name, Little Market, was changed with the official one, the Saint Nicholas Market.

The Belgrade Main railway station became operational in 1884. It was built in the southern section of the neighborhood, which was the filled swamp known as Bara Venecija. The route of the future central thoroughfare in Savamala, Karađorđeva Street, was urbanistically regulated for the first time in 1893, when the construction of high, massive, lavish buildings, "palaces", began. Buildings of the older proprietors were joined by the new ones built by Dimitrije Marković, Božidar Purić, Aksentije Todorović, Marko Stojanović, etc. Some of them were among the wealthies people in the state, and centered their palaces around the Little Market. Many of those buildings survived until today. Construction of the square in front of the railway station building began in 1892. First stock exchange in Serbia became operational in Savamala in 1895. in In 1896, three smaller streets, from the Sava Gate to the Paranos Han (Savska, Majdanska and Donja Bogojavljenska), were merged into one named Savska. Remaining route, from the khan to the Main Railway Station, was named Moravska. In 1898, city administration decided to step up the urbanization of the neighborhood, so the smaller, side streets were cut through, the port and quay were regulated, elementary school was opened and the filling of Bara Venecija was finally finished.

When Belgrade was divided into six quarters in 1860, Savamala was one of them. By the census of 1883 it had a population of 5,547. According to the further censuses, the population of Savamala was 6,981 in 1890, 6,516 in 1895, 8,033 in 1900, 9,504 in 1905, 9,567 in 1910 and 11,924 in 1921.

=== 20th century ===
==== 1900–1918 ====
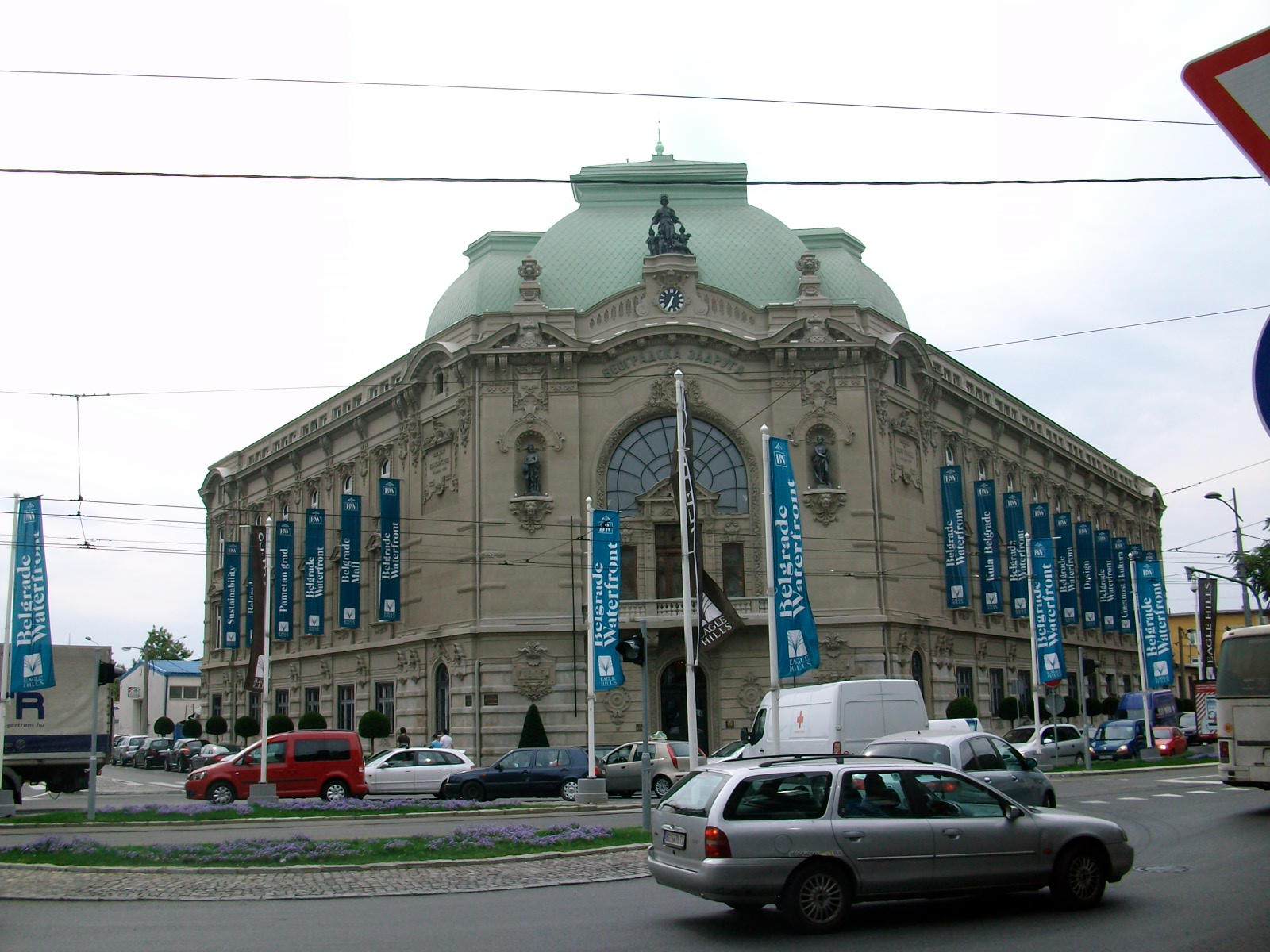
Building of the Belgrade Cooperative. Finished in 1907, it is often named as one of the most beautiful buildings in Belgrade

Early 20th century was Savamala's golden age. Through neighborhood, the spirit of modern Europe was rapidly arriving in Belgrade. In 1900, the first ice rink in Belgrade was built near the railway station. The central street in the neighborhood was formed on 29 February 1904, when the streets of Savska and Moravska were transformed into one, named Karađorđeva, which stretched from the Sava Square and the railway station, to the Belgrade Fortress. In order to straighten and extend the street, the city purchased the Paranos estate and demolished the "Paranos Han". Belgrade Cooperative purchased the estate of the Krsmanović brothers in order to build their own building, so the construction of buildings and palaces along the Karađorđeva continued. Building of the Belgrade Cooperative was finished in 1907, the House of Đorđe Vučo in 1908, Hotel Bristol in 1912, Hotel Washington (later Hotel Wilson), etc.

Despite the filling of the former bog from the Prokop stopped in 1898, the filling and construction of the embankments wasn't finished, so the area was still regularly flooded. The drainage system in the upper sections, at Sarajevska Street, was built only in 1904. Former central commercial spot, the Little Market was withering by this time. In terms of architecture, it was completely surrounded by the massive, sturdy buildings, while economically, the business moved into the surrounding banks, monetary funds and major commercial companies. When construction of the Bristol Hotel began in 1910, the market was completely closed. In 1911, Ljubomir Krsmanović announced construction of the four-storey building facing three streets, which was to be the final object around the area of the former market, instead of the old hotel "Bosna". Also in 1911, the project was drafted for connecting Savamala and Zeleni Venac with tram line. Hughly advanced for its time, the project envisioned tracks on the reinforced concrete pillars reaching above the buildings. City rejected the plan.

Before World War I, first Serbian female architect Jelisaveta Načić arranged the small square in front of the Belgrade Cooperative. In the center of the square the statue named Sava Nymph, work of Đorđe Jovanović, was to be placed. By 1914, Savamala was the most densely populated area of Belgrade with arranged streets, primary school, first bank in Serbia and a quay along the bank of Sava was under construction. The area around the Little Market became the most prestigious one in the entire city and was affordable only to the wealthiest ones. Still, some old ways, like selling watermelons and melons from the barges on the river survived. Having both the port and the railway by which visitors arrived, soon numerous hotels were built, both in Savamala and the Kosančićev Venac above it. Hotels Bosna and Bristol were built close to the port. There were also the hotels Solun and Petrograd, which was built on the Wilson's Square. Hotel Orient was located at the corner of the Hajduk-Veljkov Venac and Nemanjina streets, close to the Financial Park.

Heavy bombardment by the Austro-Hungarian forces in World War I damaged the neighborhood and stopped for a while its affluent progress. With the neighboring Belgrade Fortress, it was on the front line of Austro Hungarian attack. The attack stopped numerous plans and projects, some of which were never accomplished, like the Palace of Ljubomir Krsmanović or the Sava Nymph. At the end of the first, short-lived Austro-Hungarian occupation of Belgrade in 1914, Savamala was the location of the frantic evacuation of the occupational forces on 15 December 1914. Originally marching in lines, the soldiers turned into the madding crowd running in disarray. They used ferries to reach the other side of the Sava, taking valuables they plundered. Due to the hastiness and overcrowding, the ferries were capsizing in the wavy river as the "murky Sava was carrying away drowned soldiers".

==== Interbellum ====
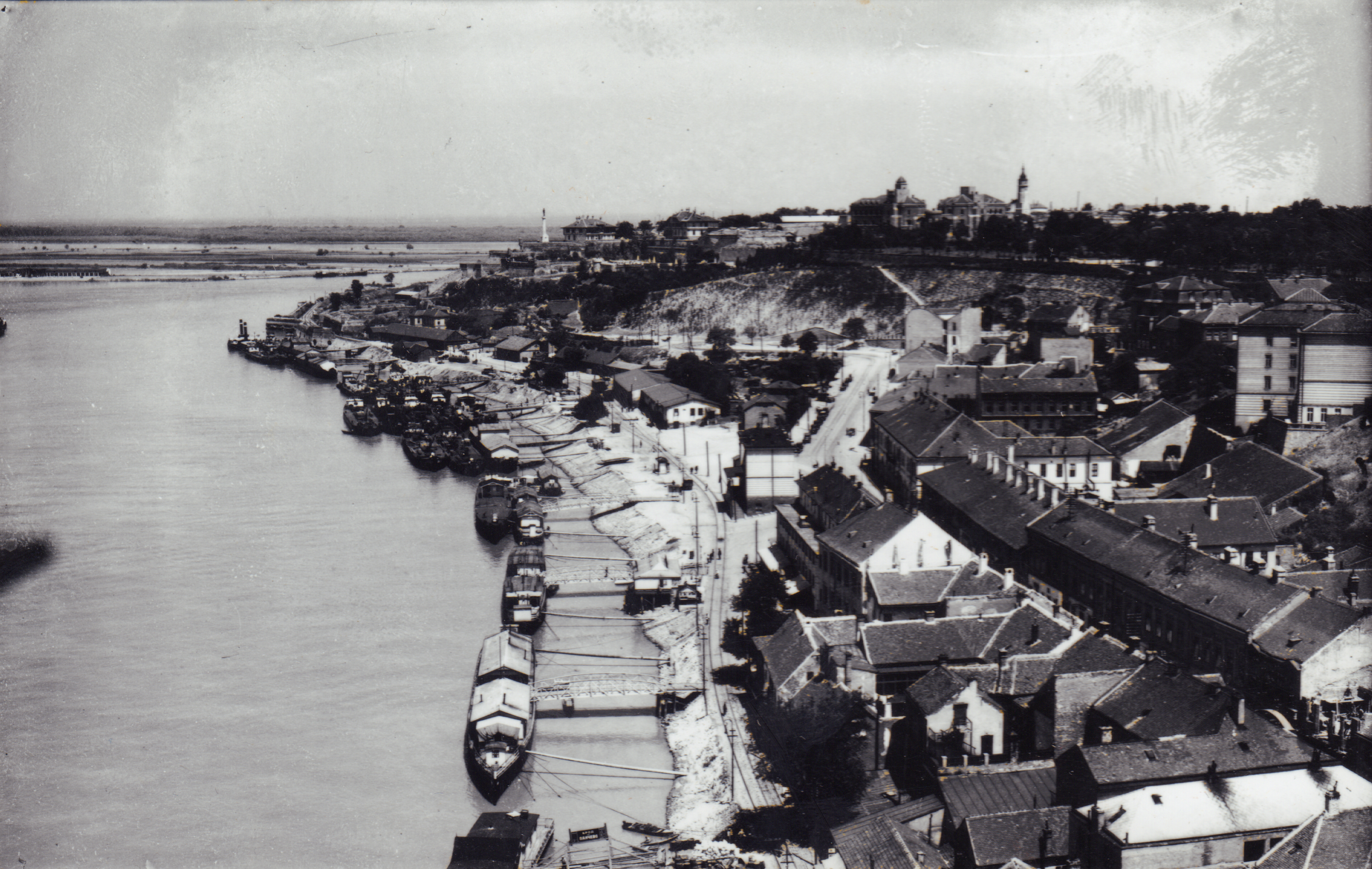
Sava port in 1933

After the war, construction of the large buildings continued. The Palace of Rista Paranos was built 1922–1923, at 67 Karađorđeva Street. It is one of the rare examples of the Baltic Modern architecture, which flourished from 1900 to 1914, originating in Saint Petersburg and Helsinki, before spreading to Stockholm, Riga, Tallinn, etc. The palace was designed by the Russian white émigré architect Nikolai Vasilyevich Vasilyev. The building is known for the reduced façade decoration, simulated architrave in the style of Mediterranean eaves and the hexagonal, domed tower.

In 1920, the Society for the Construction of Catholic Church in Belgrade was founded, with the purpose of building the Roman Catholic Cathedral. City administration originally donated the parcel in Krunski Venac in 1924, but by 1926 the deal was off. The Society asked for the land lot in Savamala, at the corner of the Nemanjina and Sarajevska streets, but the city refused to do so, as the park was planned for the area, offering another parcel in the city. In 1929, city finally offered the lot in Savamala again, at the location of the grain market, where the modern Palace of Justice is located.

In 1930, the society announced international design competition which resulted in 129 designs (79 from Germany, 18 from Austria, 15 from Yugoslavia, and the rest from Switzerland, Italy, Czechoslovakia, Bulgaria and Hungary). The project of German architect Josef Wenzler was chosen. He planned a monumental, three-naves basilica, 65 m (213 ft) long and 36 m (118 ft) wide. Total floor area was to cover 58,938 m^{2} (634,400 sq ft) and host 4,300 people (3,390 sitting, 910 standing). The Society changed its mind regarding the lot, asking for another parcel in Palilula. City refused, offering a lot in Dorćol, which in turn was rejected by the Society and, after the ensuing money problems, the Society was disbanded and, ultimately, the central church for the Roman Catholics in Belgrade was never built.

During the Interbellum, major changes in the neighborhood were results of the construction of the King Alexander Bridge across the Sava, which was finished in 1934. In order to make access path to the new bridge, numerous commercial and residential objects had to be demolished. This way, the Karađorđeva Street, and with it the neighborhood, was almost physically divided in two. Section from the bridge to the Main Railway Station was wealthier and more representative, with palaces and luxurious façades. With additional reconstructions, this part of the street was transformed into the proper boulevard with greenery. Section from the bridge to the fortress was mostly occupied by the family houses, trade and hospitality objects, and port facilities.

As the first building in Belgrade with elevators, the massive building which hosted the Ministry of Transportation was built from 1927 to 1931. At modern 6 Nemanjina Street, and in front of the square-park Hajduk Veljkov Venac, designed by Svetozar Jovanović, it was the largest building in the Kingdom of Yugoslavia and the largest ministry building in the Balkans. Heavy fighting occurred around the building in October 1944, during the liberation of Belgrade, as it was the last stand of the German army. The building was damaged, too. After the war, the building hosts headquarters of the Serbian Railways. The lot covers 5,500 square metres (59,000 sq ft), while the total floor area covers 16,000 square metres (170,000 sq ft). The monumental, square building, designed in eclectic and neo-classicist style, is domineered by the clock tower above the central tympanum of the front façade. It has distinctive figures of Atlas on its side, two artificial stone sculptures at the entrance (male, holding a flywheel, and female, holding the railway's symbol), and numerous other stone sculptures by Toma Rosandić, Dragomir Arambašić, Živojin Lukić, Lojze Dolinar and Risto Stijović. The building was declared a cultural monument in 2007.

Already after the war, plans were made for further filling of the area next to the railway, in order to expand cargo section of the station, but they were put on hold. In the early 1940, city decided to finish the draining. On 9 March 1940, a contract was signed with the consortium "Danish Group" for pouring 500,000 tons of sand on the section between the railway and the river, and from the station to the bridge. The same consortium (made of Danish companies "Kampsax", "Højgaard & Schultz" and "Carl Nielsen") was already hired by the city to start construction of New Belgrade, across the Sava. The "Sydhavnen" excavator was transported from Denmark, and was supposed to finish works by 1 October 1940. However, the excavator continued to work after the German occupation of Belgrade in April 1941. It finished works in 1943, completing the draining and filling of the former marsh.

The section along the Karađorđeva Street continued to be flooded, especially during the torrential rains, when mud floods would flow down from Zeleni Venac. Especially damaging floods occurred on 25 July 1938, and in 1940 and in April 1941 (after the bombing of Belgrade), when the Sava spilled over. Despite constant protests to the Belgrade municipality, the protective embankment has not been built other than already existing one at the railway station. German occupational authorities began construction of the embankment in 1942. It was never finished, but some sections are still visible in the 2020s.

==== World War II and later ====
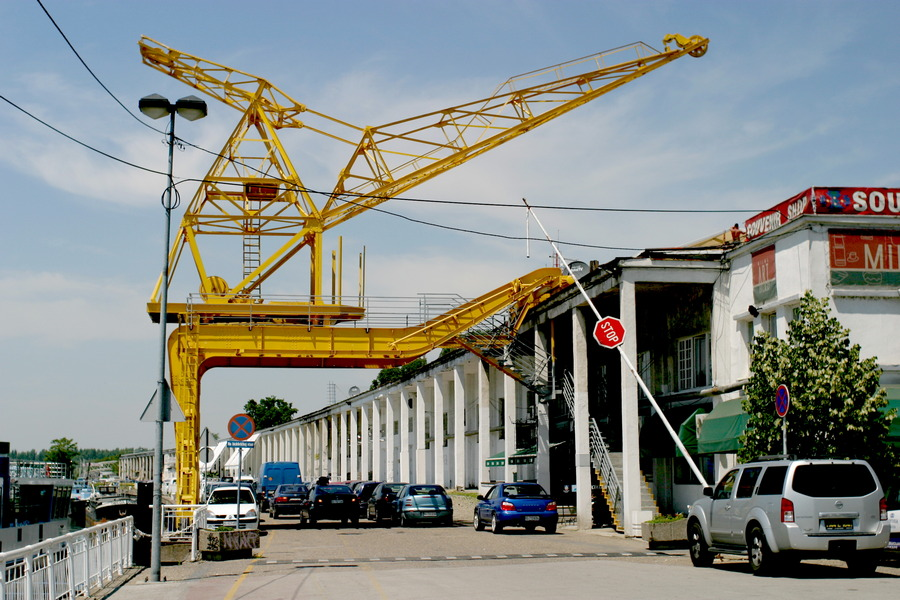
Beton Hala, a row of former storages in Sava port, in 2009

Savamala was also heavily bombarded and partially demolished in the World War II. Demolished objects, some of which were left in ruins and torn down immediately after the war, include Đumrukana, King Alexander Bridge and Hotel Wilson. After 1948, state and city authorities favored the construction of New Belgrade so Savamala lost the importance it had. It became a transport hub and a transit route for commercial traffic which made it even less desirable neighborhood to live in due to the noise and air pollution. As a neglected neighborhood, in the 1960s Savamala became known for its local rascals, typical for the Belgrade at that time, when each neighborhood had ones. It had such a bad reputation that mothers would warn their misbehaving daughters that if they do not act nice, they will "marry them into Savamala".

A 1959 plan envisioned urban axis Belgrade Main Railway Station (Savamala)-SIV Building (New Belgrade) as the baseline for the future development of both old and new parts of Belgrade. The area between these two points, described as "two basal foundations", was to be spanned with nine urban blocks, spreading on both sides of the Sava. Railway station itself was to preserve its function, with additional overhaul which would make it look like the largest railways stations in Europe ("large lace made of glass and steel"). Savamala was to be populated with hotels, bus station, terminus for the airport transport, megamarkets, etc. However, disliked by the group of influential architects, in the future development the envisioned urban tissue was effectively "cut" in its Savamala section by the new projects, and almost nothing of the planned has done.

Savamala was tackled by the 1985 International Competition for the enhancement of the structure of New Belgrade. Aleksandar Despić, vice president of the Serbian Academy of Sciences and Arts at the time, authorized architect Miloš Perović to organize the teams of architects and create a new vision for Savamala. The conditions of the project included the reconstruction and revitalization of the neighborhood into the Belgrade's cultural hub, keeping the "historical matrix" and "nosatalgia of history". The project was presented in the gallery of the academy. The project was titled "Cultural Center for the 3rd Millennium". Proposition by the Serbian architects was titled "Sava City" (Savski Siti). As it was an international architectural design competition, the first prize went to the work of Polish architects, which included the formation of a Renaissance square and Venice-type canals. It was described as "aesthetically, rarely seen elegance and style".

In 1991 Serbian Academy of Sciences and Arts held non-competitive contest and the most popular solution was a project by which Savamala and New Belgrade will be connected by the web of canals and an artificial island in the middle of the river, with residential, commercial and catering facilities. All of this was changed later because of the Belgrade Waterfront project. The academy in 1993 coordinated several projects by 1993, best known of which was the concept of "Water Town" (Varoš na vodi), by architect Dragomir Manojlović. Projects included two new, boulevard-sized bridges and canals deep into the city urban tissue up to the "Sarajevska" Street.

Another project, strongly pushed by the government at that time but highly unpopular as a concept, was the 1995 "Europolis project" which planned to cover entire section of Belgrade from Terazije to the Sava river with glass. It was a combination of several previous solutions and was launched by the ruling Socialist Party of Serbia in advance of the forthcoming elections.

=== 21st century ===
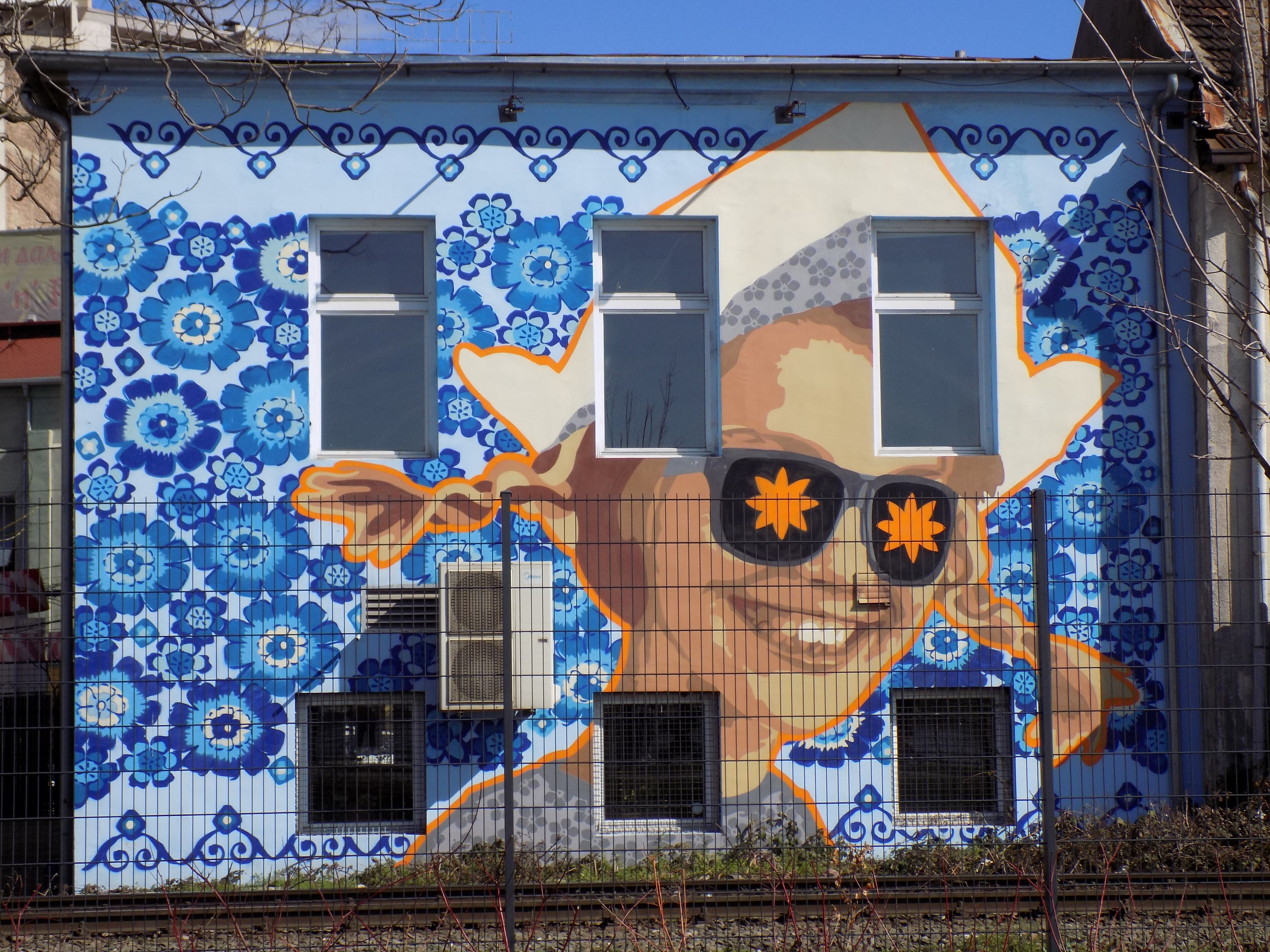
Mural "Smiling Dutch girl", painted in 2016

In 2008 city began preparatory work on the first official urban plan for Savamala, but it was going slow. Propositions included the turning of the Main Railway Station into the museum and Savamala as the location of the future opera house or the building of the Belgrade Philharmonic Orchestra. Any project would have to include the removal of the railways and the main train and bus stations. One of the thing that the urbanists put in the plans as mandatory is a ban on highrise due to the panoramic view of Belgrade from the river (hence the "amphitheater" appearance). In its strategy, city government banned tall buildings in the old section of Belgrade. All of this was changed later because of the Belgrade Waterfront project.

==== Artistic revitalization ====
In the 2010s few artistic enthusiasts began transforming Savamala into the new creative hub of Belgrade. Formerly representative buildings, but now completely dilapidated, became headquarters of the cultural organizations like Mixer house, Cultural Center "City" and Urban Incubator. They chronicled stories from the inhabitants about old Savamala and employed artists and designers to revitalize the area who painted many murals, renovated parks and set ice rinks. Also, they invited artists, architects and chefs from all over the world and organized exhibitions, work shops, concerts and lectures which are now held in Savamala almost on a daily basis. With all this development, Savamala began attracting tourists and the night life was invigorated with many new performances, galleries, clubs and restaurants. They were joined by the Society for the ambiental protection of Savamala which organizes yearly celebration of the Savamala Day.

Mixer House, moved to Savamala in 2012 from the neighborhood of Dorćol and organize regular Mixer House Festival which has over 10,000 visitors. The festival consists of movies, musical and artistic performances, lectures and exhibitions. The Urban Incubator turned the "Spanish House" into a pavilion where they coordinated workshops, exhibitions, literary nights and seminars about architecture, urbanism, design, arts and culture. Mixer House announced that it will move back to Dorćol in May 2017. The reason they cited was the frequent pressure from the state authorities. It included constant demolition orders, politically instigated inspections of all kinds and ever-growing fiscal imposts. Finally, after being presented with an ultimatum by their landlord that in order to keep renting the Savamala premises they have to close "Miкsalište", humanitarian center for the refugees, Mixer House held a final performance on 27 April 2017. After that, Mixer House moved to Sarajevo in September of the same year.

Savamala received worldwide attention due to its cultural renaissance. Articles about it were published in Financial Times and Wall Street Journal, CNN devoted several reports to it, while The Guardian regularly follows the happenings in Savamala, placing it among top ten most inspirational places in the world.

==== 2018–2022 reconstruction ====
Massive reconstruction of western part of the western neighborhood began in 2018, while the eastern part have been demolished completely part by part because of the Belgrade Waterfront. Citizens proposed many changes (reconstruction of the towers on the Main Railway Station building demolished in World War II, restoration of the side domes on the Belgrade Cooperative building, reconstruction of the Hotel Wilson, preservation of the building at 7 Karađorđeva Street), but authorities accepted none. Citizens, architects and urbanists protested against Belgrade Waterfront, but the project was green-lighted nevertheless. The authorities only decided to build an object at the location of the Đumrukana, but the chosen project was disliked for not resembling the old building and for not fitting into the urban environment.

Karađorđeva Street

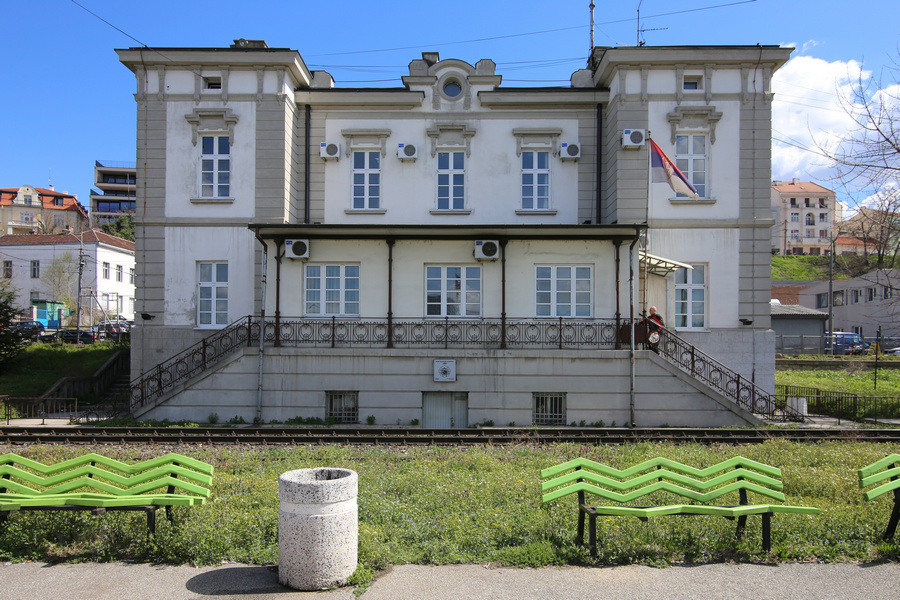
Port Authority building, built in 1906

In July 2017, city urbanist Milutin Folić announced the reconstruction of the Karađorđeva street from the Beton Hala to the Branko's Bridge, along the southern border of Kosančićev Venac. The works, projected by Boris Podrecca, should start at the end of 2017 and will include: widening of the sidewalks, planting of the avenue, further reconstruction of the façades, relocation of the tramway closer to the river and placing them on the cobblestones and construction of the parking for the buses which pick up the tourists from the port. Works were postponed for the summer of 2018. The planned 14-months long reconstruction was then postponed to September 2018, but it didn't start then either. The area set for reconstruction is 682 m (2,238 ft) long and covers 1 ha (2.5 acres). Indented parking spots for tourist buses are also planned. Works were then scheduled to start in mid-November 2018 and the deadline is set for the late 2019 or early 2020.

In the summer of 2019 the contours of the reconstructed area became noticeable. The experts criticized the project, especially the transportation solutions. Though the project was to fully separate the street carriageways and the tram tracks which crossed each other once, they are now crossed twice in only 230 m (750 ft). The planned boulevard from the direction of Belgrade Waterfront will be 45 m (148 ft) wide, but it will enter the Karađorđeva which is only 7 m (23 ft) wide and already constantly clogged with traffic. With other "unfathomable slips in design", the project has been labeled a "shame for designers". With continued criticism of the design (including the tourist workers who pointed out the inadequacy of the project as at some days, there are 15-16 buses needed to transport the tourists from the port, while the project envisions place for only 3 buses), city administration replied that everything has been done after "Podrecca's design".

Before and concurrently with this reconstruction, several facades of the houses on the left side of the street were revitalized (there are no edifices on the right side, it is open to the river), as they have been neglected since the end of World War II. A notable exception is the house at No. 7, projected by Konstantin Jovanović and built in c.1890, basically abandoned and squatted since the war ended. It was a home of the philologist Katarina Jovanović. Already dilapidated, it was further damaged in the fire in June 2019. A 20-years old woman was arrested for arson. In January 2020 the house burned again, with only the outer wall surviving. This prompted speculations that someone is deliberately destroying the house in order to obtain the parcel, enhanced with several plans for the lot already laid by some private companies. The house is not protected and no one applied during the restitution process to claim it.

In 2019, city selected a design for the cultural and multipurpose building at No. 13, on the location of the former Đumrukana. In March 2022 another building, at No. 15, was announced. Modernist structure will host the University of Arts' Faculty of Applied Arts. By 2021, the only surviving old structure along the promenade between the Branko's Bridge and Beton Hall is the building of Port Authority (lučka kapetanija), located at No. 6 Karađorđeva. One-floor, free standing edifice was built in 1906. All four facades are symmetrical, and ornamented with decorative plastic. The building is described as the representative example of the pre-1914 academism architecture in Belgrade. In November 2021, city announced building's renovation.

Complete renovation of the remaining section of the street, from the Branko's Bridge to the Sava Square was announced, as a possibility, for 2023, or concurrently with the construction of the new bridge, the Savamala-Palilula tunnel, and the roundabout which should connect them all.

Linear Park

It was announced that the idea was to transform the entire section into the linear park, patterned after the High Line park in New York City and Zaryadye Park in Moscow, which would extend around the Belgrade Fortress and Dorćol, all the way to the Pančevo Bridge. In April 2019 it was announced that the linear park will stretch for 4.7 km (2.9 mi) and cover an area of 47 ha (120 acres).

In June 2019 city planned to hire the Diller Scofidio + Renfro design studio for the linear park. However, in December 2019 city announced that the design will be given to 10 different Serbian teams (all members have to be below 40 years), each for one of 10 planned segments of the park. It was reported though, that finances were probably the problem, as the city refused to disclose how much the New York studio asked for, while the World Bank backed off from financing the project, with city claiming the conditions of the credit are not favorable anyway. Beginning of the construction was tentatively moved to 2021. Ten teams were publicly presented in February 2020 and the deadline for the completion of works is set for 2023. In November 2020, the beginning of the construction was moved to the end of 2021, and deadline to the end of 2024, but the works were again pushed for January 2022. Construction officially began on 24 January 2022.

In August 2021, city expanded the project to 66 ha (160 acres), of which only 22.8 ha (56 acres) will make the green corridor. Rest will be privately owned residential buildings, commercial structures and sports fields. This caused negative comments from experts and architects. New design would actually push people away from the river, to walk along the present boulevard which encircles the fortress. The fortress itself will be degraded and devalued, so architects and archaeologists suggested surveys, explorations and conservation of the fortress' foothills instead. Project was described as a smokescreen, with the actual purpose being selling of the banks to the private investors and lifting the real estate prices.

Sava Quay

Though the deadline for the other works approached (31 January 2020, except for the line park), it was obvious that works are not progressing. Just few days after city urbanist Marko Stojčić stated that everything will be finished by the end of January, deadline was moved for 7 months, to September 2020, prolonging the reconstruction to 2 years. Though some finishing works remained to be done, so as cleaning of the area from rubble, and some new works already deteriorated, works were declared finished in early December 2020, so already in April 2021 the repairs began, but by April 2022, the never fully finished quay and street began to deteriorate due to the low quality works and lack of proper maintenance. This continued, and the difference was especially visible compering it to the Sava Promenade, which continued after the Branko's Bridge, and, as part of the Belgrade Waterfront, was kept meticulously clean.

Right across the tracks from the street, on the port promenade, there was the kafana "Promaja". It was mentioned for the first time in 1906. It was listed in the "Belgrade kafanas" book by Branislav Nušić, who described it as the "symbol of the city spirit, woven into its name" (promaja, Serbian for draught, flow of air). Since 1968 it was located in the temporary object on the promenade. Planned for demolition from 2016, on 25 October 2019 it was forcefully demolished, with police assistance. Until the projected deadline of 31 January 2020, almost nothing has been done on the quay, except that it has been dug out. Authorities claimed the problem with the "Promaja" for the delay, and later claiming that the quay was not part of the original deadline at all, but the official documents dispute this. These works were completed in December 2020.

The quay continued to degrade. By the April 2023 many granite slabs used for paving broke and crumbled, streetlamps were broken, the grassy areas were messy, numerous graffiti were painted and even the traffic lights in the Karađorđeva stopped working.

Memorials

In October 2015 city decided to erect a monument in the memory of Austrian-born humanitarian Diana Budisavljević. Budisavljević saved 15,000 children (of which 12,000 survived) from perishing in the concentration camps in the Independent State of Croatia, operated by the Ustaše regime during World War II. In November 2018 it was announced that a monument will be placed in the neighborhood of Staro Sajmište, along the Sava quay and next to the already existing memorial of the Sajmište concentration camp. The monument was to be dedicated in the second half of 2019. Nothing has been done by November 2019, when city announced that the monument to Budisavljević will be erected across the Sava, on the Sava quay between the renovated Karađorđeva Street and the river. Also, the section of the future linear park between Branko's Bridge and the building of the Beton Hall will be named after her. By February 2021 the park was already named after Budisavljević, and the location of the future monument was marked with a square of granite cobblestones. However, no monument has been erected by January 2024. In October 2021 a design competition for the monument was organized. There were 16 submissions, and all were rejected. One was excluded due to the technicalities, and the others were rejected by the jury as not being "adequate to the theme and heroics of Diana Budisavljević". Jury asked the city to organize a new competition, but city purchased five of the rejected designs with "enough esthetic elements".

== Characteristics ==
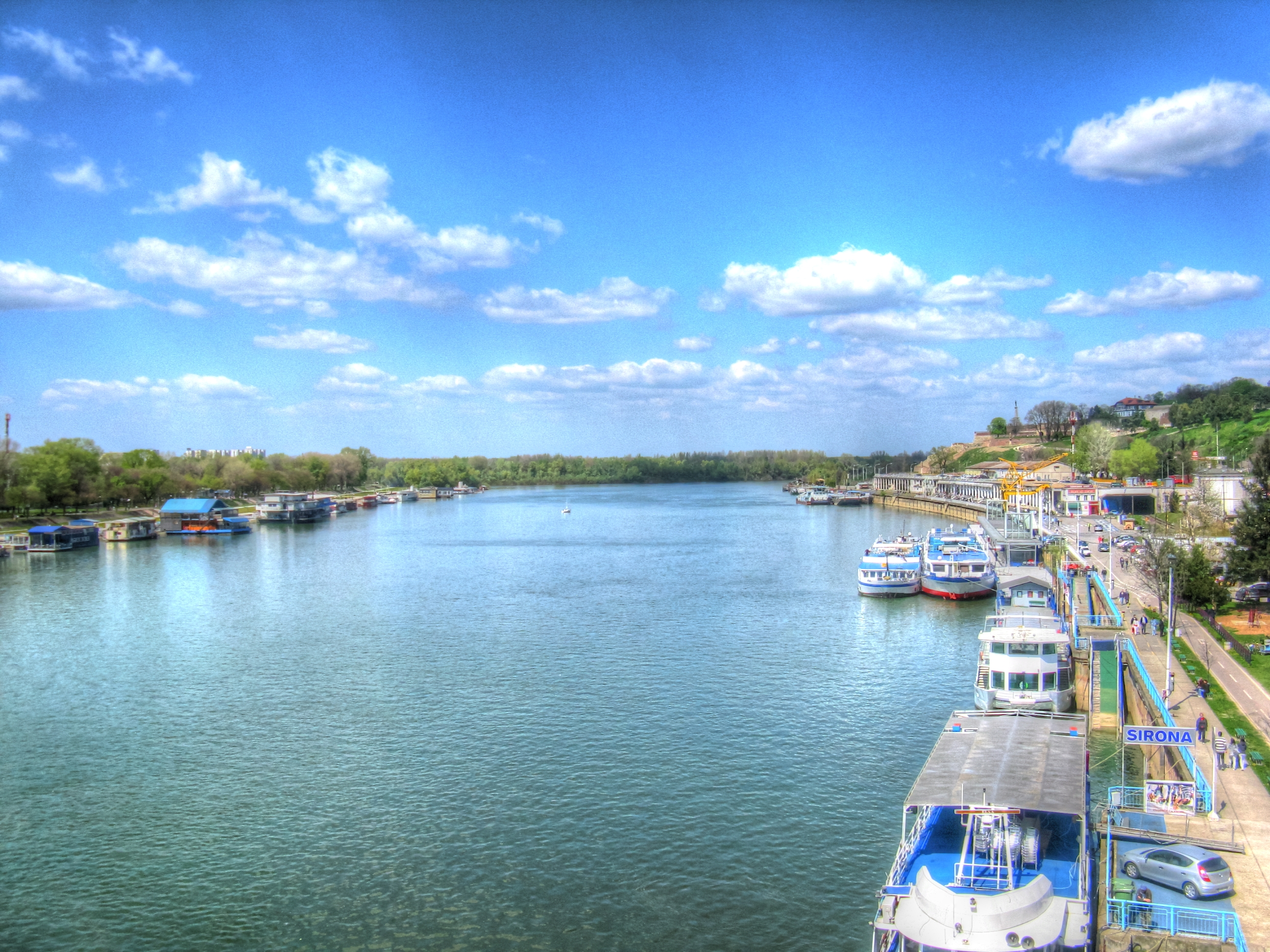
Sava Port

Savamala is the main section of the "Sava amphitheater" (Savski amfiteatar). It is a section bordered by the Karađorđeva and Savska streets (extending a bit outside of the Branko's Bridge and the Gazela bridge) in the old part of the city, and by the Vladimira Popovićа street in New Belgrade. It covers an area of 185 ha (460 acres), out of which 107 ha (260 acres) in the old section, 47 ha (120 acres) in New Belgrade and 31 ha (77 acres) of the water surface of the Sava. The term "Sava amphitheater" was coined by the architect Đorđe Kovljanski in 1923 when he projected a plan by which Savamala would be turned into an island. Savamala was much shaped by the architectural work of merchant Luka Ćelović, which includes hotels, palaces and parks (Park Bristol, Park Luka Ćelović).

The name comes from the name of the Sava river and mahala, contracted usually to ma('a) la in Serbian, one of the Turkish words for neighbourhood or block of houses.

Due to its relative low altitude toward the Sava, and lack of any protection, Savamala is the only part of the central urban area of Belgrade that gets flooded during the extremely high waters of the river. It was almost completely flooded in 1984 and during the major floods in 2006.

Although considered as one of the most neglected parts of downtown Belgrade (mostly due to the very bad maintenance of the Karađorđeva street and surrounding buildings), Savamala is the location of many important traffic features in the city: the Karađorđeva street itself (with a railway parallel to it and the tram tracks), two bridges over the Sava (Brankov most and (Stari) Savski most), Belgrade Main Bus Station and bus station of the Lasta transportation company, Belgrade Main railway station and the Sava port (Savsko pristanište). The area (squares and parks) around the bus and train stations is known for prostitution and pornographic cinemas, further contributing to the already poor image of the neighborhood.

Out of many kafanas and shops, only few survived today. Kafana "Zlatna moruna" (Golden Beluga), built in the late 19the century, at the corner of the Kamenička and Kraljice Natalije streets, is one of the rare. Meeting point for the members of the revolutionary movement Young Bosnia prior to the World War I, it was restored in 2013. Confectionery store "Bosiljčić" in the Gavrila Principa street is the only one in Belgrade that still produces handmade candies. University of Belgrade's Faculty of Economics is located in Savamala.

Lagums, underground corridors beneath the Savamala, which were used as wine cellars, and the little known Armenian cemetery which was located on the slope beneath the Hotel Moskva, fell into oblivion. The few remaining Armenian tombstones were preserved in the National Museum until the 1980s when they were relocated and exhibited in Belgrade Fortress. Lagums are located along the Karađorđeva Street, being dug into the hill below Kosančićev Venac so that goods could be stored directly after being loaded off the boats in the port.

One of the tallest edifices in the neighborhood is a nine-floor building of the Palace of Justice (Palata pravde), with a total floor area of 28,700 m^{2} (309,000 sq ft). A judiciary center, with several courts, prosecutors offices and detention rooms, it was built from 1969 to 1973. The building was closed in 2017 and all the judicial offices relocated due to the massive reconstruction which will be finished in 2019. In front of the Palace there is a monument to Emperor Dušan, holding Dušan's Code, a legal codification compiled in 1349.

Despite all the changes in the neighborhood since the 2010s, in August 2021 it was announced that city's Institute for the Cultural Monuments' Protection is conducting a study on Savamala's protection as the spatial cultural-historical unit.

=== Sava Square ===
After the Main railway station was built in 1884, the area to the east developed into the square which, due to its location close both to the railway and the port, served for the transshipment of the goods. In 1892 city decided to fill the area in front of the station and to form the square. The square was designed by the architect Eduar Leže, who "stuck the needle point in the station vestibule's entrance and draw a circle with 120 metres (390 ft) diameter". As the main goods were the cereals and grains, so in time it was named Žitni trg ("Grains square"), but on 2 February 1896 it was officially renamed Nikoljski trg ([Saint] Nicholas' square).

It was also well connected with the roads which lead outside of the city. It was directly connected with the road which is today the Savska Street in the direction of the Mostar neighborhood. There, it was splitting in two directions, one to the east (later neighborhoods of Jatagan Mala and Prokop) in the direction of Kragujevac in central Serbia, and the other to the south (neighborhoods of Senjak, Čukarica, Žarkovo) and further to the west Serbia.

The square was renamed Vilsonov trg ("Wilson's Square") after World War I, on 14 February 1919, in honor of the US president Woodrow Wilson and today in named Savski trg ("Sava Square"). Hotel "Petrograd" was built at the square and was mostly occupied by the visitors which stayed only for a few days in the city. It was especially popular among the travelers who arrived by the Orient Express. In the 1930s, the city developed further, as a series of new buildings stretching from the "Petrograd" were built along the Nemanjina Street, including the "Beograd" hotel and the Home of the Invalids. Hotel "Beograd", designed in 1936 by Milutin Jovanović, and finished in 1939 as "Grand Hotel Beograd", is considered a typical example of "Belgrade moderna" style.

The square was again renamed in 1943, during the German occupation, when it was named Srpski trg (Serbian square). After the liberation, the new Communist authorities renamed it on 20 April 1946 to Trg Bratstva i jedinstva (Square of Brotherhood and unity), before it was named Savski trg (Sava square) in 2004. The pedestrian section of the square, encircled by the public transportation terminus, was in time adapted into the park, which later hosted the war victims monument. Before it was demolished during the 2020s reconstruction of the square, it covered 0.43 hectares (1.1 acres). Another square-roundabout was adapted into the park, at Hajduk Veljkov Venac, covering 0.34 hectares (0.84 acres).

In the early 2000s, veteran organizations began action for the monument which would commemorate the victims of the 1990s wars. The design competition was announced in 2005, and out of some 20 submissions, the first prize wasn't awarded in September 2006. Instead, the second placed design by the architecture students Jelena Pančevac and Žarko Uzelac served as the basis for the project. Dedicated to the "War victims and defenders of the homeland from 1990 to 1999", unique in Serbia regarding the period it commemorates, it was ceremonially dedicated on 24 March 2012. The complex was made of two parts. One made of corten steel, and another one with the inscription, in front of the Home of the War Invalids. In the extension of the inscription was the section with pebbles, while the glass plate represented a "river of life", memorizing death of young soldiers. In front of the Saint Sava hospital flower beds, also made of corten steel, were placed.

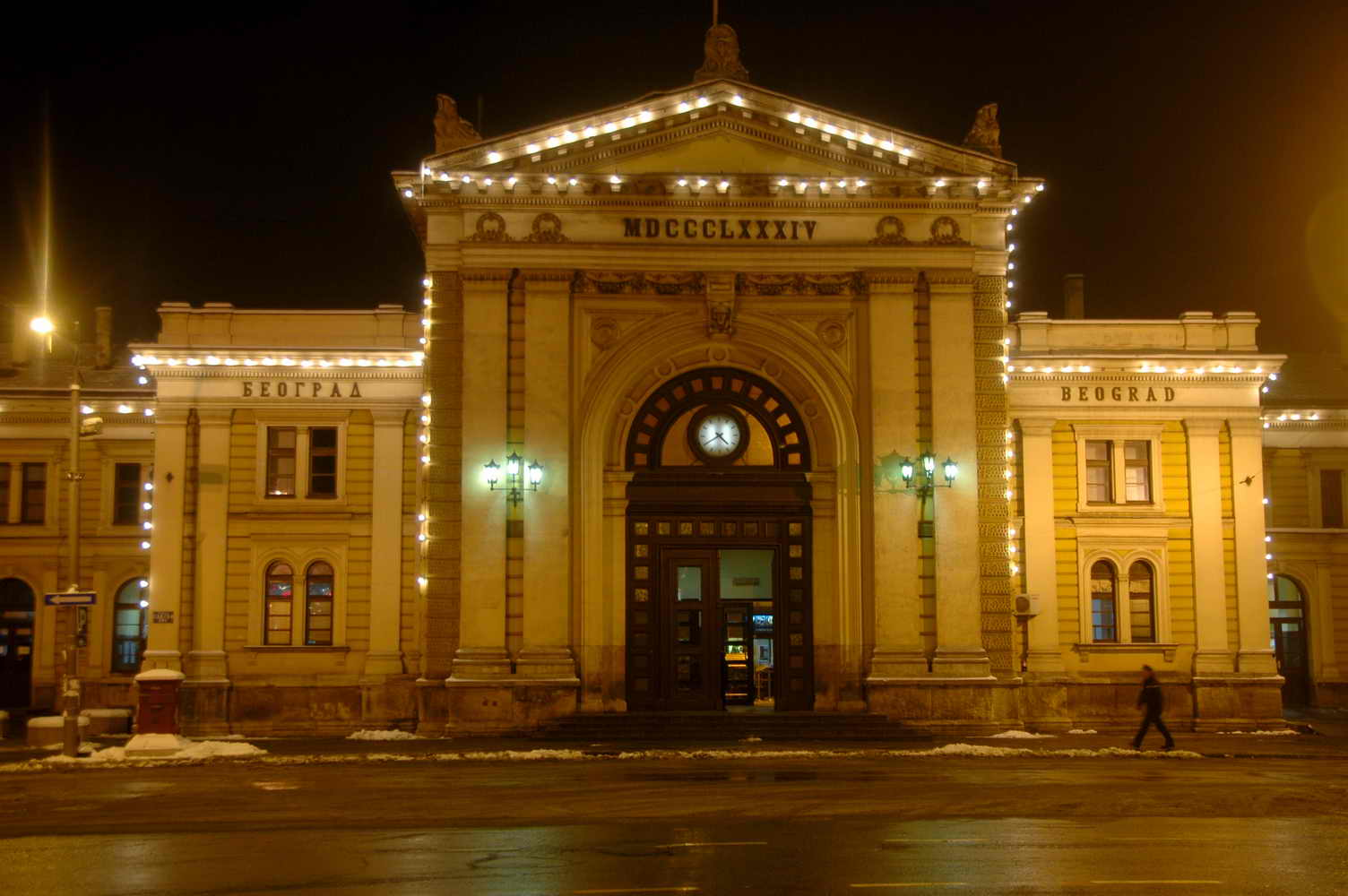
Belgrade Main railway station, located at the Sava Square

Project Belgrade Waterfront envisioned complete change of the square area. The section in front of the Belgrade Main Railway Station will be turned into the plateau with large monument to Stefan Nemanja, facing the Nemanjina Street, named after him. The monument is a personal wish of the President of Serbia, Aleksandar Vučić. The existing street routes will be turned into the semi-circular crossroad and the traffic will be relocated to the edge of the square. The existing roundabout of the public transportation and a memorial for the 1990-1999 war victims, placed in the 2000s, will be relocated. The existing buildings around the square will be kept, but some will change their purpose (Main Station will be turned into the museum, with added gallery). Post Office Building No. 6 will also change its purpose, though a possibility was announced that it may get its famous pre-World War II façade.

In November 2018 city announced an architectural design competition for the future arrangement of the square. Designs have to follow all the guidelines set by the Belgrade Waterfront project. The project chosen by February 2019 will be the basis for the future plans. Chosen design was by the Fenwick Iribarren Architects, from Spain which envisioned the square as the open, green semi-circle, with the focal point being the future 23 m (75 ft) tall monument to Stefan Nemanja. Also, the project didn't move the tram track outside the circle, but kept them through the center of the pedestrian zone. The deadline given by the city administration for the full completion, the fall of 2019, is deemed too optimistic. The project was changed once more by the city in May 2019. The tram tracks were again moved to the periphery of the central semi-circle while the statue of Stefan Nemanja is also restored to the originally planned height of 28 m (92 ft). With the total area of 12,000 m^{2} (130,000 sq ft), Sava Square will become the largest pedestrian square in Belgrade.

Author of the monument is Russian sculptor Aleksandr Rukavishnikov. The size and the design of the monument to Stefan Nemanja provoked public and artistic criticism. Sculptor Miodrag Živković quit the commission which selected the monument, considering all five designs bad and accusing politicians of choosing the monument. All four artistic members of the commission voted against this design, but five political appointees voted for. Historian Predrag J. Marković called it the continuation of almost two decades long "Arkanization of the monumental skyline" in Belgrade, while rector of the University of Arts in Belgrade, Mileta Prodanović, said that the proposed project is devastating for the building of the railway station and that Belgrade is being transformed into Skopje. President of the Academy of Architecture of Serbia, Bojan Kovačević called the project "irritation" and a part of the city administration's "fifth year of spite towards the public and profession" and "logorrheic phase of the spatial auto-goals". He criticized the bidding process as fake and farcical and pointed that important Belgrade architects boycotted the bidding, adding that we "used to laugh at Skopje". Architect Slobodan Maldini pointed to the inadequacies of the competition, including the composition and competency of the jury and a fact that the name of the winner leaked 8 days before it was officially announced. Spanish work is formally flawed as it has no documentation needed, the monument is different in appearance, size and location from the already chosen Russian sculpture. Maldini stated that the competition is a result of the greed and incompetence and described the project as "unacceptable concreting without ideas" and the sculpture as pricey and megalomaniacal.

Nevertheless, works began in July 2019 but were halted the next month, with removal of the temporary and auxiliary objects from the square. The 1990-1999 war victims memorial will be moved to the green area in front of the Railway Museum, on the small square of Hajduk-Veljkov Venac, up the Nemanjina Street. Works were continued in December 2019 when the original deadline, 15 February 2020, was postponed to the late May 2020. The officials claimed the changes in the traffic during the works will be minimal. However, the public transportation grid was changed already at the start of the works, while in January 2020 it was almost completely disrupted. Changes also caused massive traffic jams, so the traffic was partially rerouted to the newly built, partially operational streets within Belgrade Waterfront (Woodrow Wilson Boulevard, Nikolay Kravtsov Street) but the clogging just spread here, too. On 29 February 2020 the square was completely shut down for traffic which led to the unprecedented disturbance in the tram lines grid: out of 11 lines, only one functioned properly, two used changed routes, while 8 were completely shut down. Shutting down of the tram traffic and its partial replacement with buses caused widespread traffic jams over the city and crowds of commuters. Section of the square was partially opened for traffic in May 2020, but for the 7th time the deadline for completion was moved, this time to the end of September, then to the mid-November, and then to the mid-January 2021.

In May 2020, despite the adamant confirmations in the meantime, it was announced that the old post office building, which occupies the south-west section of the square, won't be restored to its pre-World War II appearance. City claimed the full reconstruction will be financially imprudent as the building lost its original structure. Instead, the architectural design competition will be organized, with the task of incorporating elements of the old look. The postal building was the last in the line of projects promised to be reconstructed to its old appearances, but were mostly just refurbished instead (Belgrade Main railway station, Belgrade Cooperative, National Museum of Serbia). After negative public backlash (comparing the other cities which restore their landmarks like Berlin, Budapest or Warsaw), chief city urbanist Marko Stojčić stated a month later that the original façade will be restored.

Amidst the continuous and almost unanimous objections by the experts, construction of the monument to Stefan Nemanja began on 15 August 2020. It was announced that the piles are 15 m (49 ft) deep, that out of monument's 28 m (92 ft), 5 m (16 ft) will be underground and that monument will "shine" due to the decorative lights. Deputy mayor Goran Vesić called it a historical moment, which will be only surpassed by the day when president Aleksandar Vučić unveils the finished monument. When the group of professors from the University of Belgrade Faculty of Philosophy, aided by the Serbian Ombudsman, pressured city government to disclose info on the price of the monument, it turned out that the state government declared this info confidential in 2018, and sealed until 2023. The pedestrian section of the square, and the monument, were ceremonially opened on 27 January 2021.

In July 2021 it was announced that the relocated Monument to the killed in the wars of the 1990s will be dedicated on Mitrovdan, Saint Demetrius Day, on 8 November, the feast day of the veteran's association. The new design was selected, a 2 metres (6 ft 7 in) tall granite memorial with carved opened hand. It was still not decided whether parts of the previous memorial will be embedded into the new one, or just the inscription will be re-carved. In November 2021 it was announced that the monument was neither sculptured nor city allocated money for the monument at all.

The deadlines continued to get prolonged: first to the spring of 2021 and then to the October (tram traffic restoration) and November 2021 (full completion). Trams were restored on 9 February 2022, while the remaining works continued, with tentative new deadline in May 2022. Car traffic, through the still unfinished square, was fully restored on 2 March 2022. In December 2022, several structures across the new monument which were abandoned when the works began, partially collapsed. The same section of the square was dug out again at the same time, as the underground infrastructure wasn't repaired or replaced when the entire square was dug out during the major works.

A section of the new square in front of the Stefan Nemanja's monument collapsed, with wider area becoming shaky and instable. It showed that surface granite slabs were elevated and placed on short columns. Contractors stated that it is a location of originally planned underground dry deck fountain, so a basin 80 cm (31 in) deep and covering 100 m^{2} (1,100 sq ft) was left hollow under the slabs. The fountain was tested in August 2023, but as of February 2024 it was still not working.

=== Fortress footbridge ===
In 2008 city administration announced that a footbridge (pasarela), which would directly connect the promenade and the port section at Beton-hala to the Belgrade Fortress, will be constructed. The idea of building panoramic elevators or establishing a cable car line was also considered. On the international architectural design competition "Center on the water", held in 2011, first prize was divided between the Japanese architect Sou Fujimoto and Serbian Branislav Redžić. Fujimoto's project, a spiral concrete object called "Cloud" (Oblak), was universally panned by the architects and citizens, but the mayor of Belgrade Dragan Đilas pushed the project. The experts called the Cloud aggressive and invasive: "it attacks the fortress and hides its beauty" and "invasive project which pushes the Belgrade Fortress into the background". Additionally, the price was €25.7 million. The administration wanted to combine the two projects, but Fujimoto vetoed it. After Đilas was removed from office in 2013, the project, which always remained only on paper, was abandoned. New administration signaled that they might use Redžić's project, but that didn't happen.

In May 2015, a 2006-2009 project of Mrđan Bajić and Richard Deacon with additional help from Branislav Mitrović, was chosen by the city. The project consists of a pedestrian bridge, panoramic glass elevator (just to the top of the stairs, not to the fortress) and a sculpture called "From there to here" (Odavde donde) around which the stairs will spiral. Between the stairs and the "Bella Vista" restaurant on the Sava bank a park will be formed, with a mini-fountain. Construction was planned to start in June 2016. However, the delay of 15 months followed, so the works began in October 2017, were projected to last 14 months and to cost 200 million dinars (€1.66 million). Also in October, the sculpture was exhibited on the ground next to the construction site.

City architect Folić announced that the project will represent a city's symbolic river gate, as Belgrade already has Eastern City Gate and Western City Gate, while the sculpture "Tripod" in the neighborhood of Bogoslovija, announced in November 2017, will symbolize the northern gate. When construction began, mayor Siniša Mali said that it will be finished by summer of 2018. President of the City Hall, Nikola Nikodijević, said in May that it will be open in August 2018. In August it was obvious that the works are not close to being complete and the city extended the deadline to November. In September 2018, city announced that this is just phase 1 of the project. The footbridge won't be operational until 2019 and in the spring of that year the phase 2, or arrangement of the area below the footbridge will start. The price rose to 214 million dinars (€1.8 million). The sculpture itself weights 5 tons and is 7 m (23 ft) tall. It consists of two parts, the upper one made from stainless steel, work of Deacon, and the aluminum-made lower part, work of Bajić. The sculpture was lifted on the 10 m (33 ft) tall stand on top of the elevator in August 2019.

In February 2019 the deadline was postponed to the summer of 2019. Despite already being described as "no smaller project, no more postponing", in June 2019 it was again postponed for October (when, for 2 days, pedestrians were allowed to walk on it), and then for November 2019 when after a year of postponing and two years since the construction started, the 100 m (330 ft) long footbridge should be opened. The delay was continually justified by the illegally built, shabby shack-like object on bridge's route, which took way too long to get demolished. Apart from the retroactively invented phase 2, the constructors also retroactively, in 2020, named other reasons for delay. They included problems with the foundations which had to be re-projected not to damage the lashings used for the construction of the embankment's fortification in 1914, and the tunnel to the fortress which the contractors claim was discovered when they were digging a hole for the engine of the fountain.

Opening was then postponed to 23 April 2020. However, the state of emergency was declared in Serbia in March due to the COVID-19 pandemic, so city announced that in the middle of May 2020 the pedestrians will test the bridge and the electricity will be introduced so that fountain and elevator can be tested, too. It is expected that the object will get the use permit after that. By this time the question of functionality was raised, beside the previous spotlight on constant work extensions, or aesthetics of the object. On the fortress side, the footbridge ends at the base of the fort near the Outer Sava Gate, or basically "into nothing".

The works were declared finished, and the footbridge open, on 3 May 2020. The elevator within the structure never became operational. The surrounding lot was named Park Edvard Rusjan on 9 June 2021, and the decision was made to place a monument to the Slovene aviation pioneer Edvard Rusjan in the park. In 1911, Rusjan was killed in the airplane crash in the area.

== Landmarks ==
Some of the best-known landmarks of the neighborhood include:

Edifice	Address	Built	Architects	Protected	Notes
Manak's House	corner of Gavrila Principa 7 and Kraljevića Marka 12	1830		cultural monument of exceptional importance from 1979	named after its owner, merchant Manak Mihailović; today part of Ethnography Museum
Mala Pijaca's Cross	Park Bristol	1862		cultural monument from 1987	merchant Ćira Hristić erected the black marble cross in memory of the fighters who died during the liberation of Belgrade from the Turks in 1806
Spanish House	Braće Krsmanović 2	1880			formerly one of the most representative buildings in Belgrade, in the Academism style; belonged to the Belgrade port, Serbian shipping society and was a Museum of the river shipping; today in ruins with only the outer skeleton of side walls existing. During World War I, in 1915 part of the building was adapted into the quarantine due to the outbreak of the typhus fever. After the war, the entire building was turned into a quarantine for the patients with Spanish flu, which gave the building its modern name. However, none of the official papers confirm this, so the origin of the name remains unclear.
Belgrade Main railway station	Savski trg 1	1884	Von Vlatich, Dragutin Milutinović	cultural monument of exceptional importance from 1983	
Belgrade Cooperative	Karađorđeva 48	1905–1907	Andra Stevanović, Nikola Nestorović	cultural monument of exceptional importance from 1979	often cited as one of the most beautiful buildings in Belgrade; fully restored in 2014
The House of Đorđe Vučo	Karađorđeva 61-61a	1908	Dimitrije T. Leko	cultural monument from 1997	
Hotel Bristol	Karađorđeva 50	1910–1912	Nikola Nestorović	cultural monument from 1987	

Historical population
Year	Pop.	±%
1981	26,585	—
1991	24,471	−8.0%
2002	23,781	−2.8%
2011	18,950	−20.3%

== Population ==
The population of Savamala (local communities of West Vračar, Gavrilo Princip, Zeleni Venac and Slobodan Penezić Krcun) was 18,950 in 2011. It is estimated that in 2015, population of Savamala in its widest sense was around 35,000, which is only third of the population that lived in it in the 1950s. The population of all three central Belgrade municipalities, Savski Venac, Stari Grad and Vračar, is steadily declining since the 1960s.

== Future ==
=== 2016 Savamala incident ===
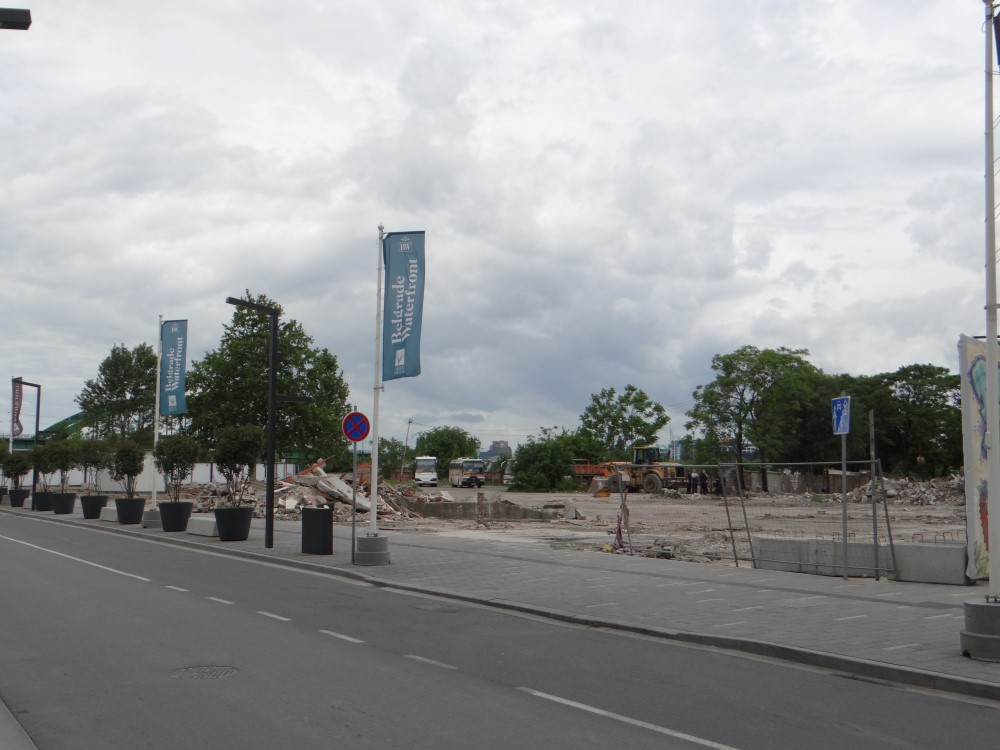
Remains of demolished buildings in Hercegovačka street in Belgrade (May 14, 2016)

In April 2016, masked persons, using bulldozers, demolished the buildings overnight in Savamala. During the demolition process, a security guard was tied up, bystanders had their mobile phones taken away and were ID'ed by the masked men. The local police forces ignored calls from citizens during that time. Only one police officer, a shift leader that night, was charged for negligence of duty and was sentenced to a 5 month suspended sentence, which allowed him to keep his job. Six months after his sentencing, an illegal building that the pollice officer participated in constructing in the neighbourhood of Mirijevo was legalized. It is believed that this happened in order to make space for an Arabian-financed project on the Belgrade Waterfront.

=== Savamala-Palilula tunnel ===
The idea of digging a tunnel which would connect Belgrade's section on the Sava slope with the area on the Danube slope existed since 1867. Emilijan Josimović, the first trained urbanist in Serbia and author of the first general plan (GUP) for Belgrade from that year, was the first to propose this tunnel. The 1923 GUP envisioned the Sava-Danube tunnel, but as a railway one. It was mentioned again in the 1938 plans as part of the future subway grid.

In the late 1940s, construction of the future entry point began near the crossroads of Kamenička and Gavrila Principa streets. However, the works had to be halted as, since the area is very prone to the mass wasting, the houses began sliding down towards the river while the construction and drilling equipment fell through into the cave and an underground lake. The hole was closed and concreted with all the equipment left inside. While this tunnel was planned to be a railway one, in 1961 company "Geosonda" began probe drilling close to the first attempt, this time for the car tunnel. Attempted at 63 Gavrila Principa Street, it was soon halted, too.

The idea is revived in 1972, after the opening of the Terazije tunnel in 1970. The 1 km (0.62 mi) long tunnel was to connect the Gavrila Principa Street with the brewery Belgrade in Cetinjska. The plan included sidewalks and tram tracks. Streetwise, it was to go underground at Gavrila Principa, elevate a bit under the 36, 38, 13 and 15 Kraljice Natalije, continue under Terazije, Hotel Moskva, school in Dečanska, 17 and 26 Makedonska, 24 and 25 in Despot Stefan Boulevard, before resurfacing in the brewery's yard. It was to be one-way tunel, with his twin being built later for the opposite way. At Terazije Terrace escalators and regular stairs were planned for commuters so they could use tram lines. Due to the various reasons (departure of mayor Branko Pešić, financial crisis from the mid-1970s, enormous projected costs of the project), the idea was again abandoned.

Pushing their pet project, Belgrade Waterfront, the city government announced in May 2017 that it has decided on the future route of the tunnel. From the direction of Savamala, it will enter underground apparently at the same place as planned before, near the Park Luka Ćelović and the University of Belgrade Faculty of Economics and will come out at the Bulevar Despota Stefana, near the building of the Belgrade City Police, with the total length of 1,993 m (6,539 ft). It will pass beneath Terazije (where it will reach its lowest, 38 m (125 ft) below ground) and Nikola Pašić Square. The tunnel will have two separate tubes for each direction. Each tube will be 9.56 m (31.4 ft) wide, with two 3.5 m (11 ft) wide lanes, two pedestrian pathways of 0.93 m (3 ft 1 in) and two evacuation exits for the vehicles. At the entry and exit points, 21 objects would have to be demolished, with the total area of 4,671 m^{2} (50,280 sq ft). Also, the Palilula exit section, streets of Cvijićeva and Dunavska, would have to be widened and adapted for the future traffic coming out of the tunnel. Analysis showed that the ground traffic will be relieved of 3,120 vehicles per hour, which will result in the reduction of the vehicle number in downtown by 10–15%, and driving time and carbon-dioxide emission by 10%. At Savamala entry point, there will be constructed a roundabout in Karađorđeva street to accommodate both the tunnel and the future new bridge on the Sava, after the surprising decision by the city authorities to demolish the Old Sava Bridge and build a new one. It was expected for the construction of the tunnel to begin in late 2018 ("at the latest") and to be finished in 30 months, i.e., by the mid-2021. Original estimates placed the price of the project between 100 and 130 million euros, but the city government now claims that it will cost only 78 millions. Still, it is more of a conceptual design for now, as the full plans and projects are yet to be done.

A detailed regulatory plan was made public in February 2018. It met with the disapproval of experts. Major objections include: lack of any cost or exploitation numbers in the plan; projected usage by personal cars only and general favoring of cars at the expense of pedestrians, cyclists and public transportation; lack of explanations and basis of the claims; assumed high price but lower commuting numbers, compared to the rail tunnels; confusion with the names of the neighborhood and the street where the tunnel ends; envisioned 90 degrees turn in the tunnel itself; provision that, "if necessary", the polluted air and smoke will be released in the city public areas above the tunnel (streets, parks); planned demolition of the wider urban tissue at the entry point; suggestion that, since the underground of Belgrade is plagued by groundwaters, the work should be done "during the dry season, when possible".

Only after the conceptual design was drafted, the geological surveys began. In April 2020, during the outbreak of the coronavirus, chief city urbanist Marko Stojčić sad that the project is moved to 2021-2022 (with additional 2.5 years needed to be finished), not because of the pandemic, but because the construction is not ready anyway. By this time, the project was in the phase of "preparations for the drafting of the project". In June 2022, in regard with the reconstruction of Terazije Terrace and the adjoining section of Zeleni Venac, the works are tentatively set to start in 2023.

Mayor Aleksandar Šapić connected construction of the tunnel with the demolition of the Old Sava Bridge and postponed works further claiming the new bridge will have no purpose without the tunnel. The works were postponed for the spring or summer of 2024, with long preparatory works added as the reason for delay. In July 2023 memorandum of understanding was signed with Power China International Group Ltd regarding the construction of the tunnel.
