= Park Luka Ćelović =

Park in Belgrade, Serbia

- Парк Луке Ћеловића
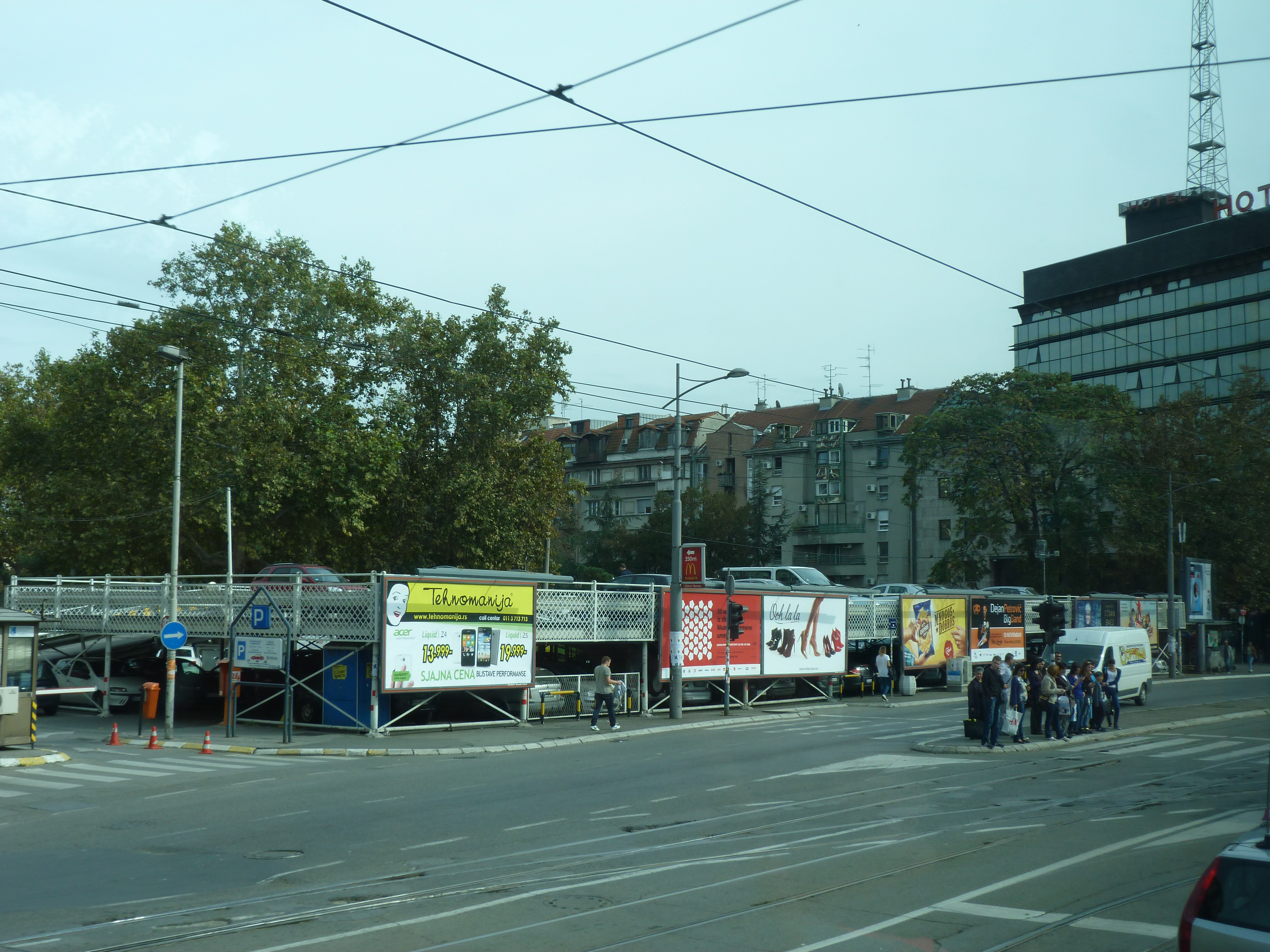
- Parking lot in Karađorđeva street, with the park behind

- Location within Belgrade
- Location: Savamala, Belgrade
- Coordinates: 44.811501°N 20.455478°E
- Open: All year

Park Luka Ćelović (Serbian: Парк Луке Ћеловића) is a park in Belgrade, the capital of Serbia. It is situated in the neighborhood of Savamala, and was called "Park at the Faculty of Economics" until 2004 when was officially renamed. It is located in the municipality of Savski Venac.

== Location ==
The park is bounded by the streets of Gavrila Principa on the east, Lička on the south and Karađorđeva on the west. North border of the park is marked by the building of the University of Belgrade's Faculty of Economics. Across the Karađorđeva street on the southern side are both the Belgrade Main Bus Station and Belgrade Main railway station. East of the park is the elementary school "Isidora Sekulić" while the Park Bristol is on the west.

== History ==
In the Interbellum, the area was location of a school which was destroyed during the German bombing of Belgrade on 6 April 1941.

The park was renovated in 1998 and repaired in 2006, while the complete reconstruction ensued in May–December 2012.

== Name ==
The park was called "Park at the Faculty of Economics" until 2004. That year, city assembly changed its name to Park Luka Ćelović in honor of Luka Ćelović, one of the richest and most influential Serbs in the early 20th century, head of the Belgrade Cooperative, a merchant and a major philanthropist. He built and urbanized a large portion of Savamala, including the building of the Belgrade Cooperative, Hotel Bristol and other buildings. He managed to obtain a permit from the city authorities to plant a European-style garden on his land. He planted roses, ornamental plants and trees and personally took care of the garden for years. Young park is already visible on the 1910 postcard from Belgrade, however that park has nothing to do with the modern park named after him, as it evolved into the Park Bristol, right across the Karađorđeva street.

Other, unflattering colloquial monikers for the park are "Picin Park" and "Avgan Park" (see below).

== Characteristics ==
The park has a proper rectangular shape. All paths lead to the central piazzetta with the drinking fountain. The original fountain was made from the famed Struganik stone, but during the 2012 reconstruction it was replaced with a new, concrete one. It covers an area of 6,669 m^{2} (71,780 sq ft) out of which 4,679 m^{2} (50,360 sq ft) are green areas. In the western section, along the Karađorđeva street, a mounted parking lot has been built.

The park started to acquire its bad reputation from the 1960s and 1970s. It became a location known for the street prostitution and the notoriety was enhanced with the vicinity of the "Partizan" adult movie theatre and the gay and transvestite prostitution in the 1980s. After participating in the film Marble Ass by Želimir Žilnik, local transgender prostitute Vjeran Mladenović (1958–2003), nicknamed Merlinka (after Marilyn Monroe), became a celebrity. As a result of all that, for decades the park has been colloquially called "Picin Park" ("Pussy Park").

By the mid-2010s, the prostitutes left the park and from 2015 it became one of the central gathering points for the Middle Eastern immigrants from the European migrant crisis. They practically turned the park into their camping ground, so the locals nicknamed it Avgan Park (Afghan Park). The constant presence of large number of immigrants causes strife with the local population.
