= Park Bristol =

Park in Belgrade, Serbia

- Svetonikolski Park
- Парк Бристол
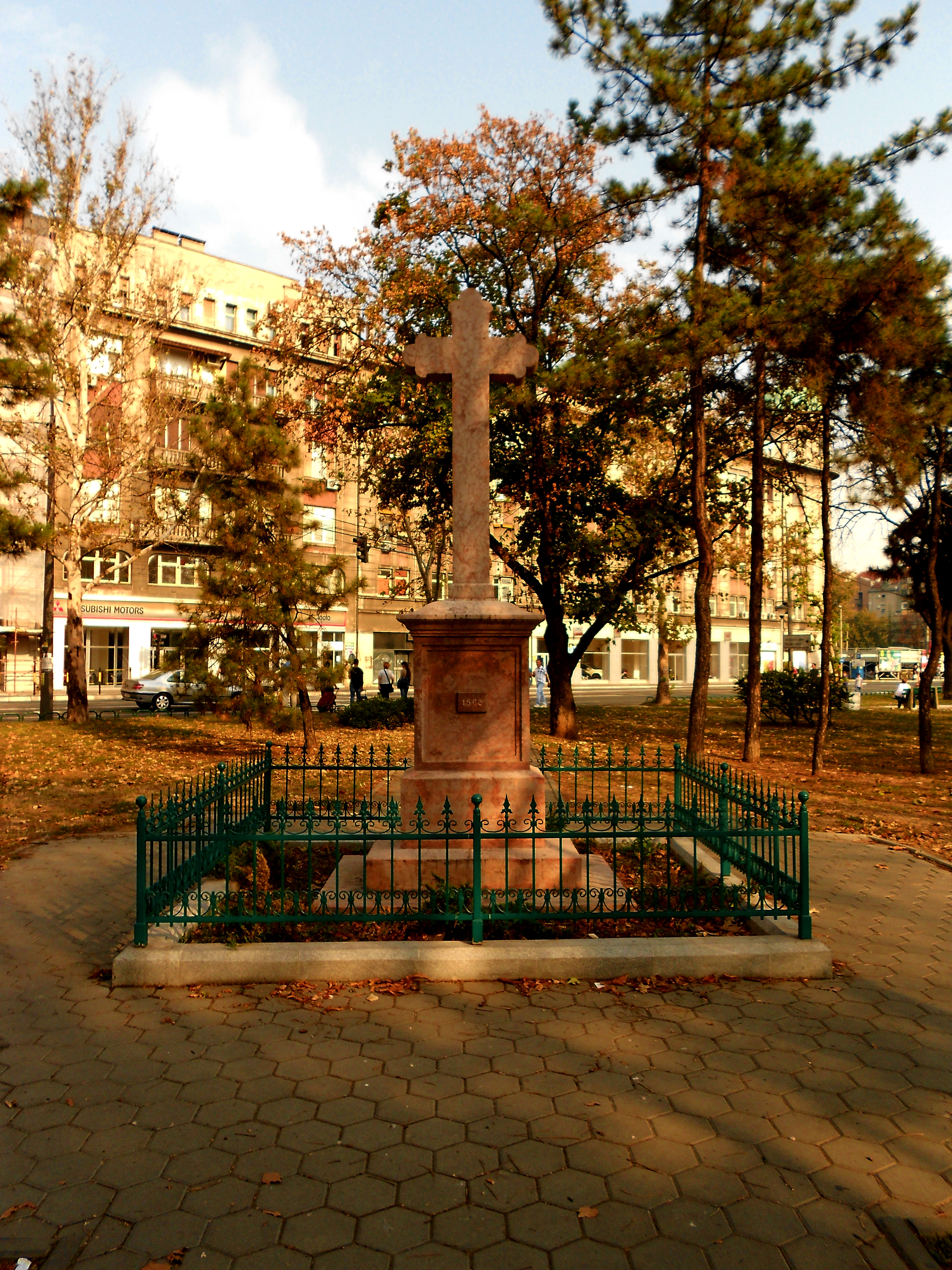
- Cross from the Mali Pijac (2012)

- Location within Belgrade
- Type: Former public park
- Location: Savamala, Savski Venac, Belgrade, Serbia
- Coordinates: 44.811653°N 20.453161°E
- Area: 12,238 m^{2} (3.024 acres)
- Created: Early 20th century
- Status: Former park removed in late 2025; replacement park and underground garage under construction in 2026

Park Bristol (Serbian: Парк Бристол, romanized: Park Bristol), also known as Svetonikolski Park (Светониколски парк), was a public park in the Savamala neighbourhood of Belgrade, Serbia. It occupied approximately 12,238 m^{2} (3.024 acres) beside the Hotel Bristol in the municipality of Savski Venac. Developed during the early 20th century from a garden established by merchant and philanthropist Luka Ćelović, it was among the older parks in Belgrade.

The remaining park was cleared in late 2025 as part of the Belgrade Waterfront development. In January 2026, the site was a fenced construction area where the former park and most of its mature trees were no longer present.

== Location ==
The park site is bounded by Karađorđeva Street to the east, Hadži Nikole Živkovića Street to the north and Železnička Street to the west. Hotel Bristol stands immediately to the north. Across Karađorđeva Street are the University of Belgrade Faculty of Economics and Park Luka Ćelović.

Before the relocation of the Belgrade Bus Station, the park stood beside the station's incoming and outgoing platforms and was commonly encountered by passengers arriving in central Belgrade. The former Belgrade Main railway station was situated farther to the south.

== Name and history ==
The park developed from a garden planted by Luka Ćelović, one of the wealthiest and most influential Serbian merchants and philanthropists of the early 20th century. Ćelović obtained permission from the municipal authorities to create a European-style garden containing roses, ornamental plants and trees on his property, and personally maintained it for a number of years. A photograph from 1910 shows the young park, which was fully developed during the 1910s and 1920s. The identity of its landscape designer is not known.

The park was originally known as Nikoljski Park, after the nearby Svetonikolski trg (Saint Nicholas Square). The name Park Bristol gradually became more common because of its proximity to Hotel Bristol.

The original park extended from the hotel to the Belgrade Main railway station and included land later occupied by the bus station. In 1942, during the German occupation of Serbia, the construction of an approach road to the Old Sava Bridge divided the park into two sections. The portion nearer the railway station was later reduced by construction of the bus station, and its remaining section was removed when the station was expanded in 1984. Only a plane tree and part of a staircase near Karađorđeva Street survived from that portion.

In 2004, the city named the park across Karađorđeva Street after Luka Ćelović, although that site had no direct historical connection to him. It had previously contained a school destroyed during the German bombing of Belgrade on 6 April 1941 and was informally known as the Park at the Faculty of Economics.

During the European migrant crisis in 2015, the park was used as an informal encampment by refugees and migrants travelling through Serbia.

== Former characteristics ==
Park Bristol covered 12,238 m^{2} (3.024 acres) and was last comprehensively renovated in 2004. Its vegetation included mature plane trees, one of which was believed to have been planted when the original garden was established.

The park's principal monument was the Cross from the Mali Pijac. Merchant Ćira Hristić erected the cross in 1862 at the Mali Pijac marketplace, in front of the former Hotel Bosna. It commemorated the insurgents who participated in the Serbian capture of Belgrade in 1806. Ćelović later transferred the monument to the park during the construction of the Belgrade Cooperative building between 1905 and 1907.

The cross is made from reddish Rosso ammonitico stone imported from Hungary. Together with the Vozarev Cross, it is among the oldest surviving monuments of its type in Belgrade. It was designated a cultural monument in 1987. Planning documents for the redevelopment called for the cross to be temporarily removed, restored and returned to the site.

== Removal ==
In December 2023, Belgrade Waterfront announced plans to reconstruct the park and finance a two-level underground public garage beneath it. The initial announcement described a garage with approximately 420 parking spaces and a replacement landscape containing more than 200 mature trees, a fountain, pedestrian paths, relaxation areas and a monument to Luka Ćelović.

An urban-planning project presented for public inspection in April 2024 increased the stated garage capacity to 450 spaces. It covered approximately 16,007 m^{2} (3.955 acres) and included the park, the underground garage and an adjoining public road. The garage was planned to occupy about 70 per cent of the park area and to be covered by a green roof containing between 1.7 and 2 m (5.6 and 6.6 ft) of soil.

The plans recorded 86 existing trees and provided for five to be retained. The remaining trees, principally chestnuts and plane trees, were to be removed to permit excavation of the garage. The neighbourhood association Naša mesna zajednica argued that the proposed soil depth would be insufficient for mature plane and chestnut trees and described the project as the destruction of the park under the name of reconstruction. It also noted that the park was located within the ecologically important Sava–Danube confluence area used by protected bird species.

Construction was under way by November 2025. By January 2026, the historic park had disappeared and the site was an enclosed construction area. By April 2026, construction of the underground garage had begun; B92 reported a planned capacity of about 450 spaces and a target completion during 2026. On 22 October 2026, Belgrade's Secretariat for Transport reported works on construction of Park Bristol and temporary changes to traffic and sidewalk use near the intersection of Bulevar Vudroa Vilsona and Zemun Road, scheduled for 17–31 October.
