= Manak House =

- Манакова кућа
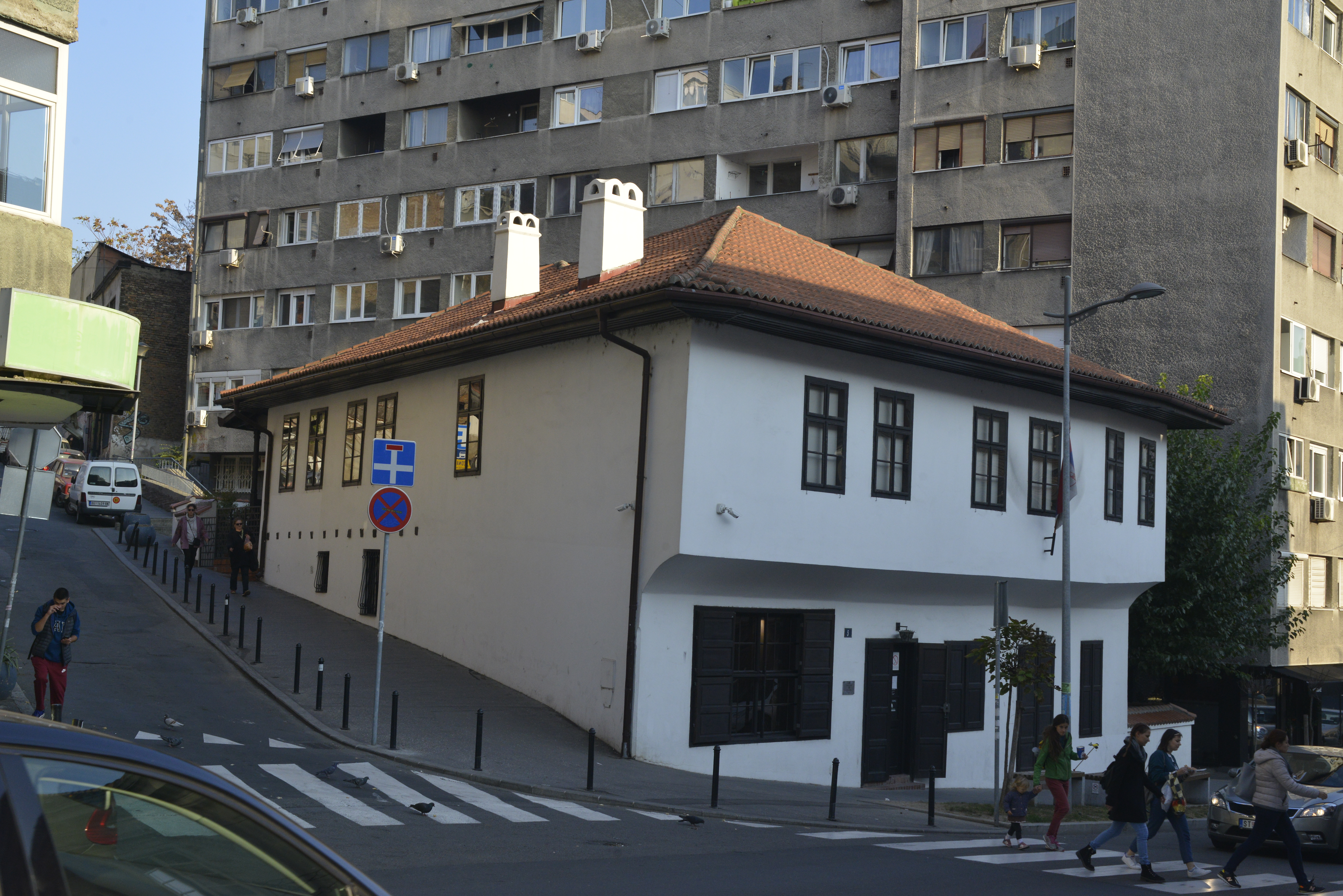
- Manak House

- Location within Belgrade

General information
- Location: Belgrade, Serbia; Gavrila Principa 7 and Kraljevića Marka 12, Serbia
- Coordinates: 44.81377°N 20.45419°E
- Completed: 1830; 196 years ago

Manak House (Serbian Cyrillic: Манакова кућа) is a building on the outskirts of the former Savamala, Belgrade. It is located on the corner of Kraljevića Marka and Gavrila Principa Streets in Belgrade, Serbia. It was declared a cultural monument by the Cultural Heritage Preservation Institute of Belgrade on 9 May 1963.

== History ==
In the early 19th century, Palilula and Savamala were the only suburbs inhabited predominantly by Serbs. The latter started from what is now Kraljevića Marka Street and encompassed the area around Zeleni venac, Bosanska (Gavrila Principa) and Abadžijska Streets (Narodnog fronta). During that time, Prince Miloš Obrenović received the Sava Embankment as a gift from the Turkish Pasha. Unsatisfied with its primitive settlements of single-story houses and dilapidated fishing huts, Miloš begun to transform the area in the hopes of turning Belgrade into a modern city.

Reconstruction of the town proceed slowly. Prince Miloš declined Felber's suggestion to hire an architect from Vienna. Instead, he hired builders from Serbia. Though skilled and experienced craftsmen, the Serbian builders lacked engineering and architectural knowledge. The lack of a methodical city plan led individuals to purchase properties and construct houses—something the prince and his advisers had not foreseen.

The exact period of Savamala's construction is unknown, although it may have been built at the time of the construction of Residence of Princess Ljubica. Reconstruction resulted in Savamala, which is now the centre of Serbian national, political, and economic life in Belgrade. The Manak House was one of the buildings the prince ordered to be preserved as the "indžiliri". Engineers demolished and created new streets throughout Savamala.

According to legend, Prince Miloš Obrenović's tatar (post office) was located in this house. At the time no regulated posts or postal lines had been established. The mail transfer was performed by postmen on horses who were called Tatars. During their journey, Tatars had short stopovers at post stations where they would change horses, rest and eat. Postal stations were named after them, and according to tradition, Manak House was on the line on which Tatars carried official letters and public documents. The house was designed for the Turkish Aga Khan and his harem.

The house was later bought by the Greek Manojlo Manak, who in the late 19th century had a bakery and a tavern on the ground-floor, and abided on the second floor. It was named after his cousin Manak Mihailović.

A photograph at Belgrade City Museum shows an inscription with the name of Arsa Petrović, in front of which are tables on the sidewalk. Besides the interest of photographers, the layout of Manak House was drawn by architect Štaudinger and graphic artist Luka Mladenović.

== Architecture ==
The house reflects the construction methods and dwelling culture of its time. It was built in bondruk, consisting of timber framing filled in with brickwork, in this case mud brick. It has a basement, ground floor, mezzanine and first floor. The layout of its rooms is the result of regulation and uneven terrain.

By the mid-1950s, the building was dilapidated and scheduled for demolition. However, its destruction was prevented: between 1964 and 1968, the Cultural Heritage Preservation Institute of Belgrade performed the necessary restoration and conservation work to revive it. Under the supervision of architect Zoran Jakovljević, the foundations were reinforced and the wooden bondruk structures were replaced. The layout and the size of rooms were retained. Interior details were also preserved. The porch was completely reconstructed. The reconstruction was inspired by similar architecture in Belgrade, Grocka and Sopot.

The structure now hosts the ethnographic collection of Hristifor Crnilović (1886–1963), a painter and collector of objects of folk heritage and art. The building was given to the city of Belgrade and now serves as an integral part of the Ethnographic Museum.

== Bibliography ==
1. B. Maksimovic, Urban Planning in Serbia, Belgrade 1962
2. Todor Stefanović Vilovski, Savamala Genesis (First attempt of regulating the Serbian town of Belgrade 1834 - 1836 - Archival studies), New Spark Vol. X p. 76-79, Belgrade 1911.
3. Gordana Cvetković, Manak's House, Almanac of Belgrade Vol. XXII - 1975.
4. Report of the Commission for Determination of the Monumental Properties
5. Documentation of the Cultural Heritage Preservation Institute of Belgrade Ph.D. Divna Djurić Zamolo, Belgrade as Oriental Town 1521–1867, Belgrade

== See also ==
- Protected Monuments of Culture (Serbia)
- List of museums in Serbia
