= Vučo House on the Sava River =

House in Serbia

Coordinates: 44.81°N 20.45°E

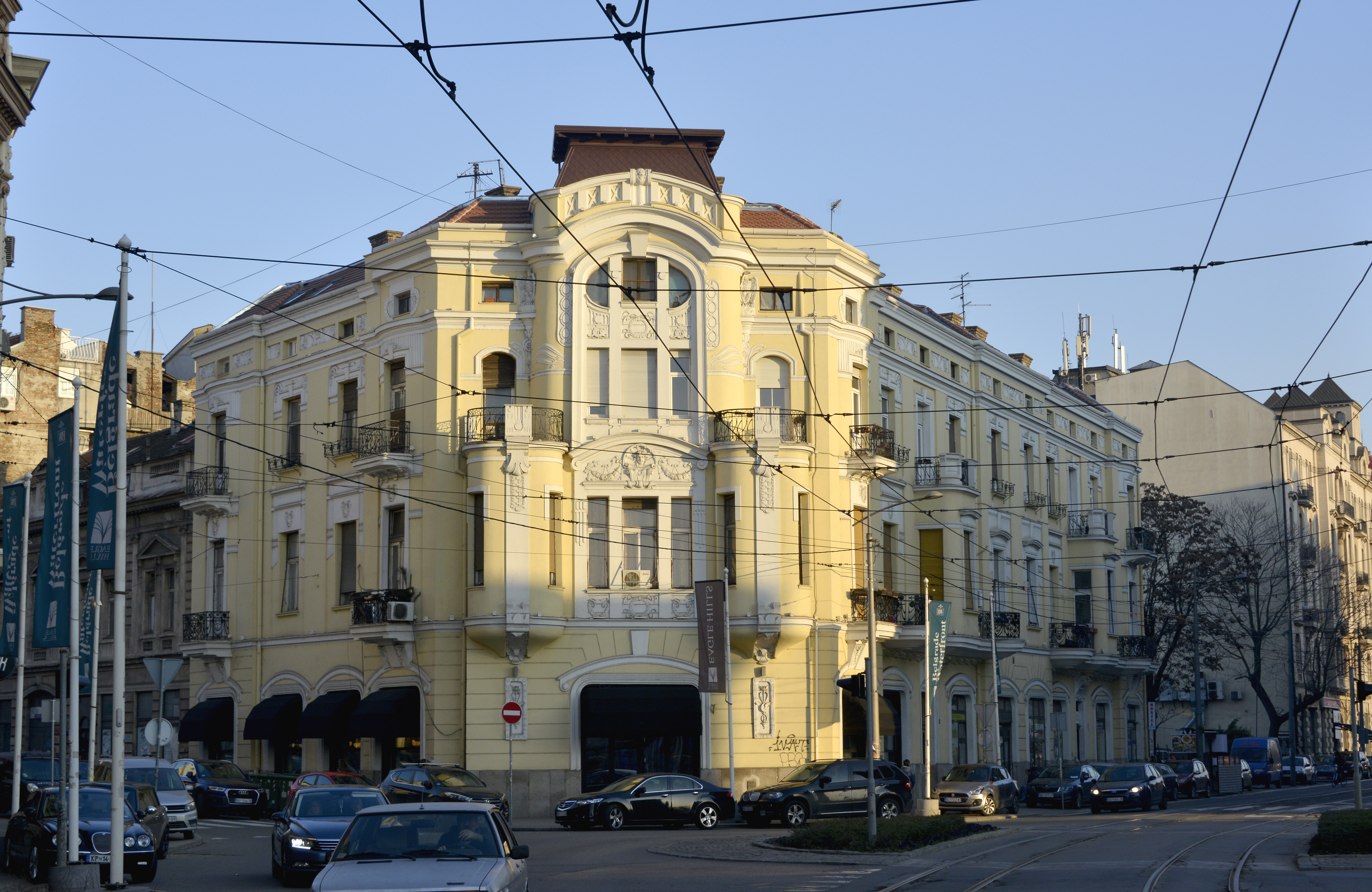
- Vučo's House on the Sava River

General information
- Status: Cultural monument
- Location: Belgrade
- Town or city: Savski Venac
- Completed: 1908

Website
- http://beogradskonasledje.rs/

Vučo House on the Sava River (Serbian: Вучина кућа на Сави, romanized: Vučina kuća na Savi) is located in 61-61a, Karađorđeva Street, Belgrade, in the territory of the city municipality of Savski venac. It was built in 1908, and it represents an immovable cultural property as a сultural monument.

Vučo's house on the Sava was erected during the flowering of "Sava settlement", by the project of the аrchitect Dimtrije T. Leko as a representative two-storey dual purpose building for the merchant Đorđe Vučo. Shops were located at the premises of the ground zone, while the upper storeys were intended for housing. In terms of space, the building is the counterpart to the opposite building of the Belgrade Cooperative.

Although the concept of the building was realized in a traditional way, using the tripartite division of facades, the processing of the main facade indicates the penetration of the new Art Nouveau architecture. Verticalism of the front facade facing the market is realized by three-part windows of the floors, which is overhung by an arched аttic with a pyramidal dome in the area of the roof. The central motif of the decorative treatment of façade is the motif of a woman's head with a shell and garlands in the semicircular tympanum field of the first floor. The side facades were enlivened by balconies of wrought iron, which are dominated by geometric and floral motifs. The ground floor was devoted to shops and the flats to representative housing.

The Vuo Family's buildings are all designed by the architect Dimitrije T., which is an interesting relationship that was uncommon in Belgrade architecture and contributes to the development of the former Mali pijac on the Sava River. Leko and represent Art Nouveau style. During the 19th century in this region, there were estates and houses of prominent citizens of Belgrade, such as Аntule, Vuče, Stojanović and others. The house of Ljubomir Krsmanović in 1894 and hotel "Bosna" were around Mali pijac. During bombing in the Second World War, the building was partially damaged. Repairs were made by the project in 1946.
