= Belgrade Bus Station =

Bus station in Belgrade, Serbia

Belgrade Bus Station Београдска аутобуска станица Beogradska autobuska stanica
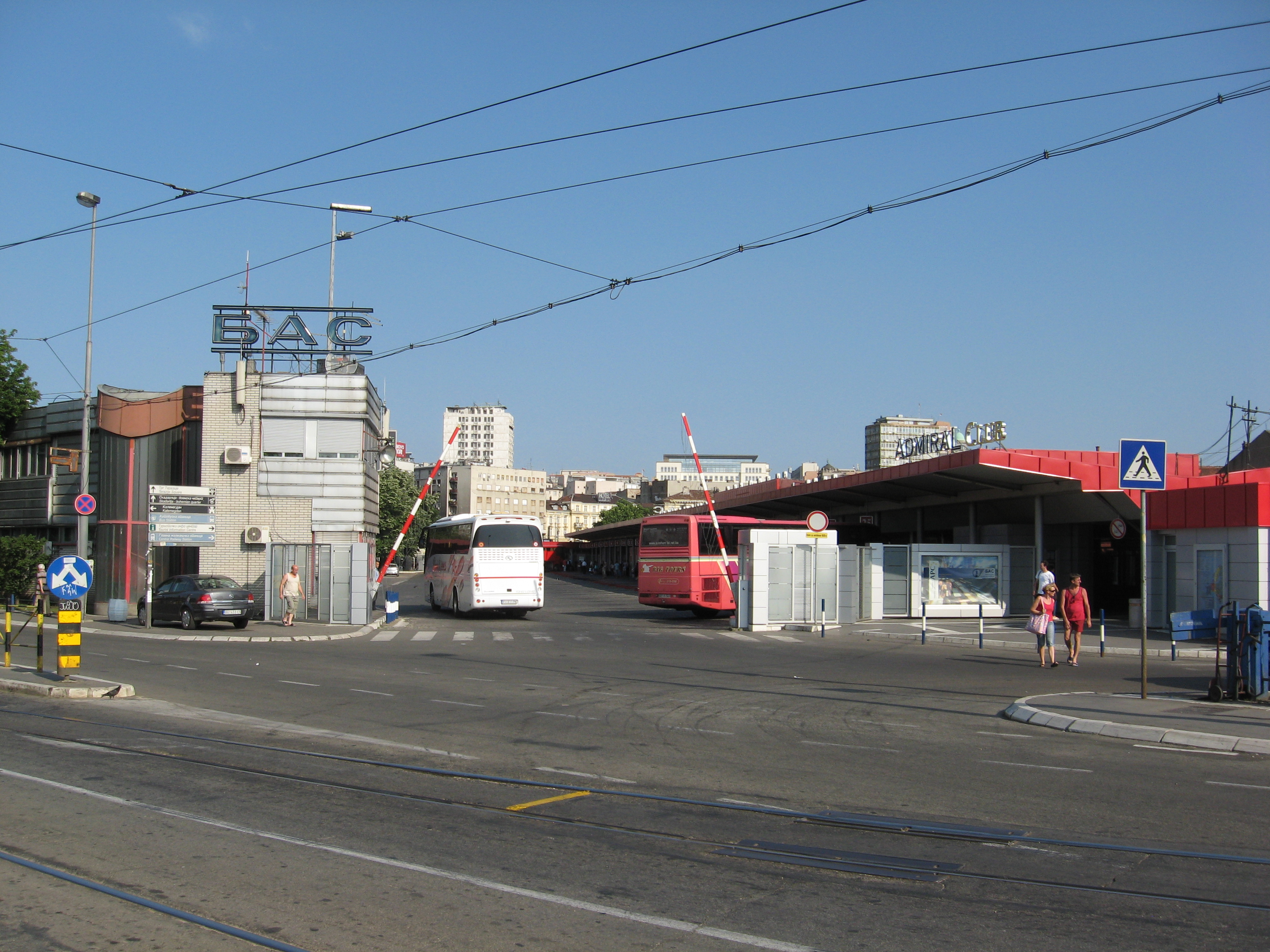
- The long-haul terminal at Belgrade's main bus station

General information
- Location: Železnička 4, Savski Venac
- Coordinates: 44.810052°N 20.454719°E
- Owner: City of Belgrade
- Lines: Lasta Beograd; Others

Other information
- Website: www.bas.rs

History
- Opened: 3 March 1966
- Closed: 29 September 2024
Location
- Location within Belgrade

Belgrade Bus Station (Serbian: Београдска аутобуска станица/Beogradska autobuska stanica; BAS, БАС) was the main bus station in Belgrade, Serbia. Located in Savski Venac, the bus station was made up of a bus depot and two bus terminals.

It was the main hub for intercity bus line Lasta Beograd. It was operated by BAS Beogradska autobuska stanica a.d. A new station was opened in September 2024 in New Belgrade, while the old one is currently being demolished.
