= Architecture of Belgrade =

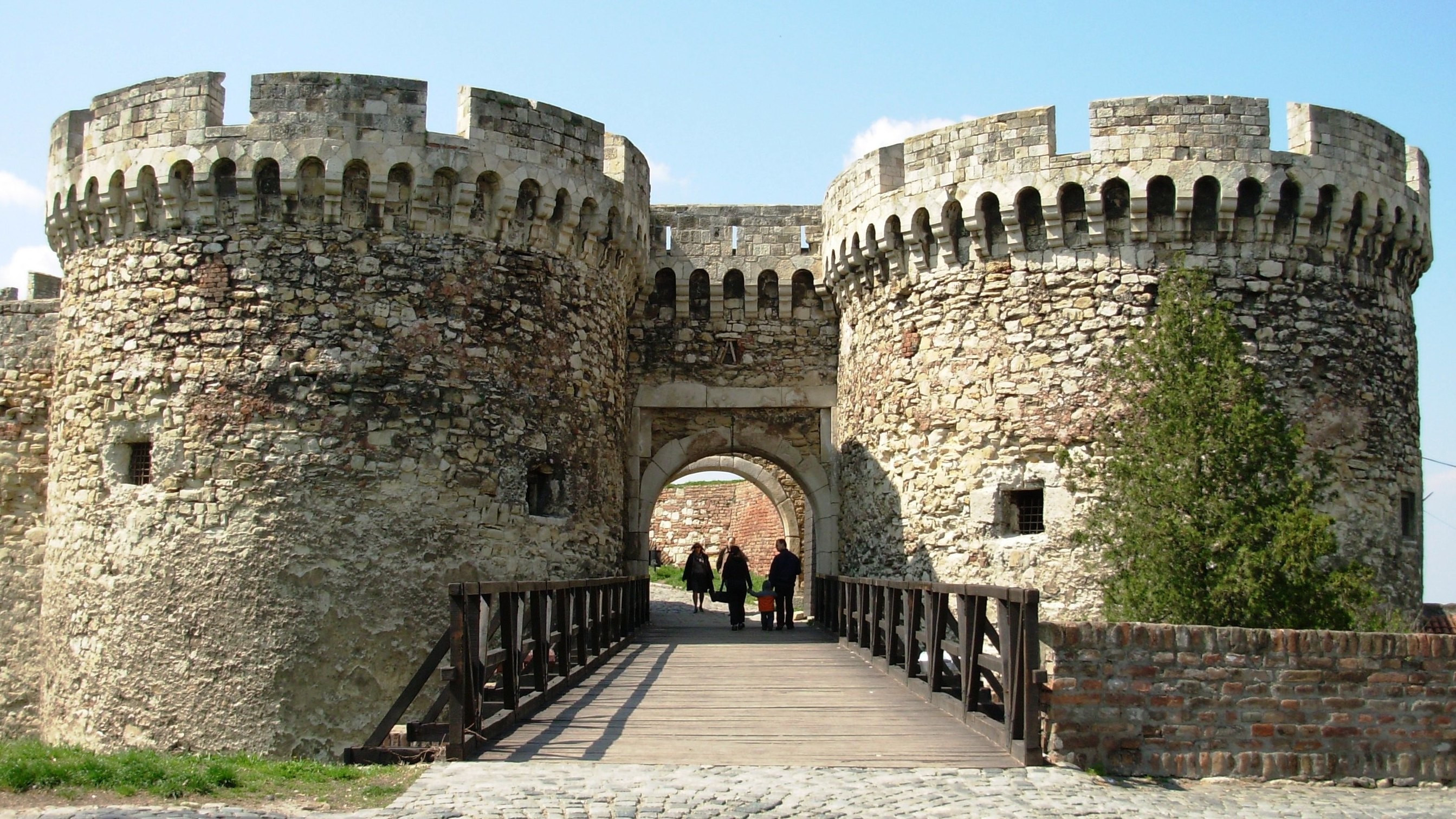
Zindan Gate at Kalemegdan, one of the symbols of Belgrade

Architecture of Belgrade is the architecture and styles developed in Belgrade, Serbia. Belgrade has wildly varying architecture, from the centre of Zemun, typical of a Central European town, to the more modern architecture and spacious layout of New Belgrade. The oldest architecture is found in Kalemegdan park. Outside of Kalemegdan, the oldest buildings date only from 19th century, due to its geographic position and frequent wars and destructions. The oldest public structure in Belgrade is a nondescript Turkish türbe, while the oldest house is a modest clay house on Dorcol, the House at 10 Cara Dušana Street from 1727.

Western influence began in the 19th century, when the city completely transformed from an oriental town to the contemporary architecture of the time, with influences from neoclassicism, romanticism and academic art. Serbian architects took over the development from the foreign builders in the late 19th century, producing the National Theatre, Old Palace, St. Michael's Cathedral and later, in the early 20th century, the House of the National Assembly and National Museum of Serbia, influenced by Art Nouveau. Elements of Neo-Byzantine architecture are present in buildings such as Vuk Foundation House, the Old Post Office in Kosovska street, and sacral architecture, such as St. Mark's Church (based on the Gracanica monastery), and the Temple of Saint Sava.

During the socialist period, much housing was built quickly and cheaply to house the huge influx of people from the countryside following World War II, sometimes resulting in the brutalist architecture of the blokovi (blocks) of New Belgrade; a socrealism trend briefly ruled, resulting in buildings like the Dom Sindikata. However, in the mid-1950s, the modernist trends took over, and still dominate the Belgrade architecture.

== Medieval and Ottoman period ==
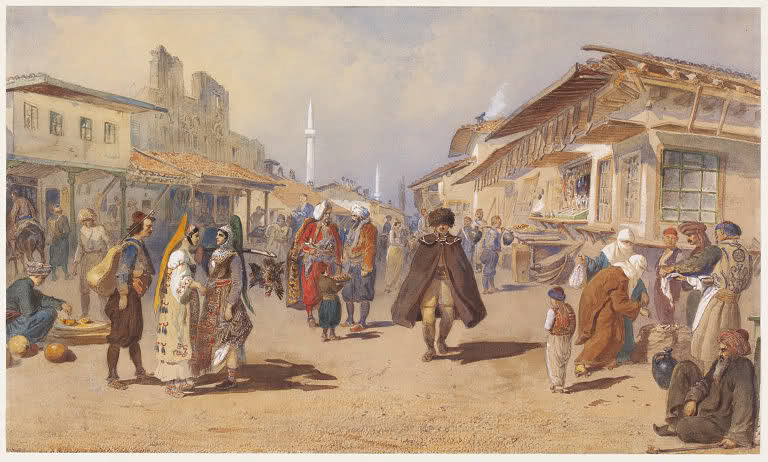
Ottoman Belgrade in a 1865 painting by Carl Goebel

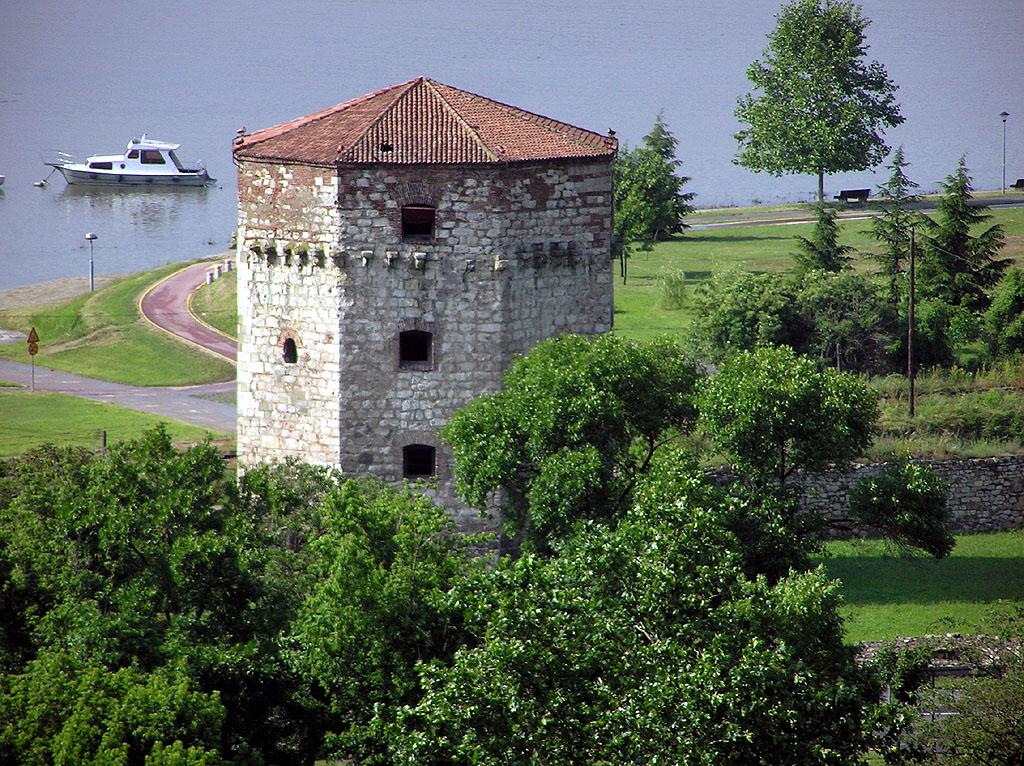
Nebojša Tower, ca. 1460

Little remains in Belgrade of its early period. The Nebojša Tower, from ca. 1460, is a lonely testimony of the pre-Ottoman medieval defenses of the town.

=== Ottoman architecture in Serbia ===
Belgrade was the main urban centre of Ottoman Serbia throughout the Early Modern period. Ottoman culture significantly influenced the city, in architecture, cuisine, language, and dress, especially in arts, and Islam.

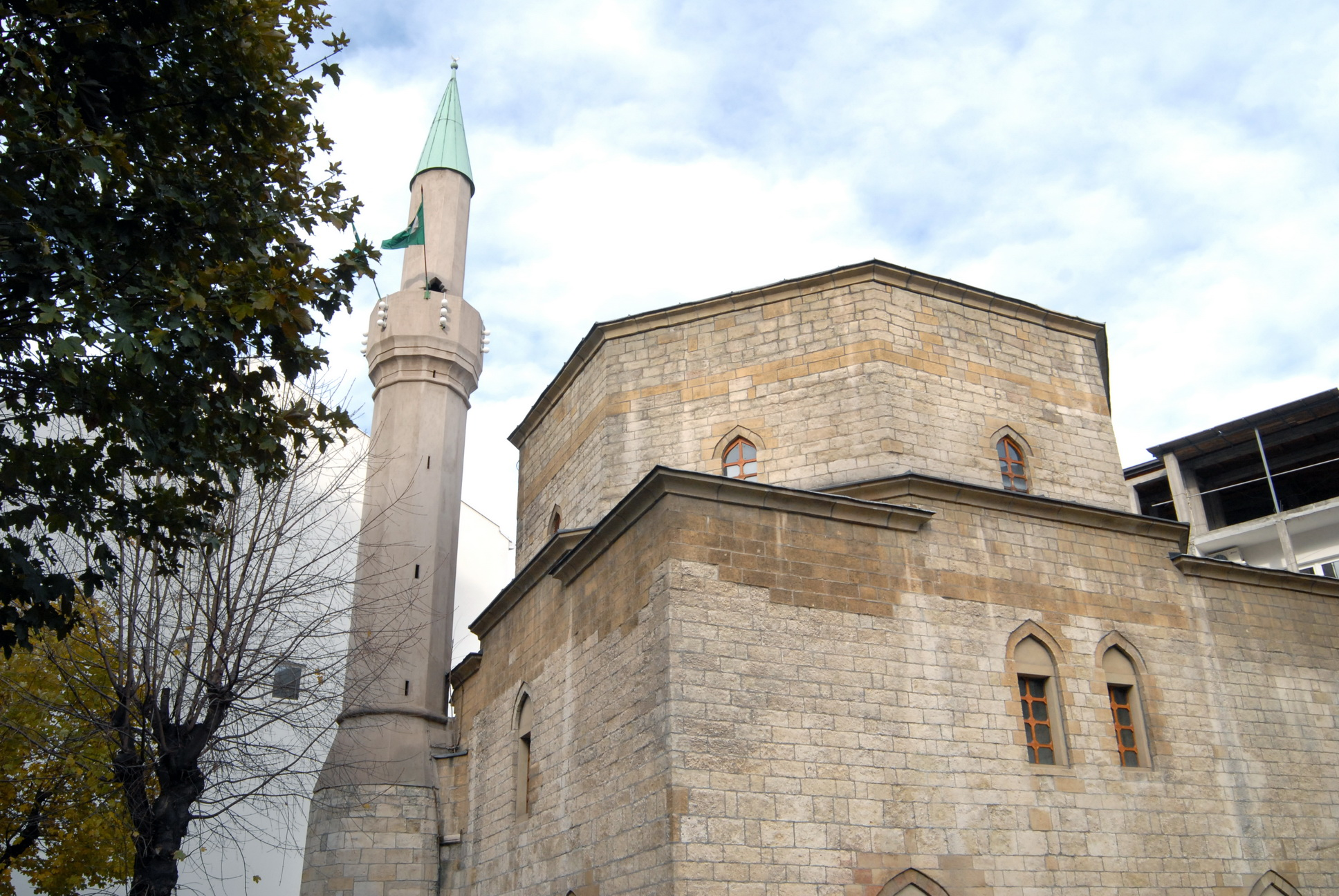
Bajrakli Mosque, Belgrade, 1575

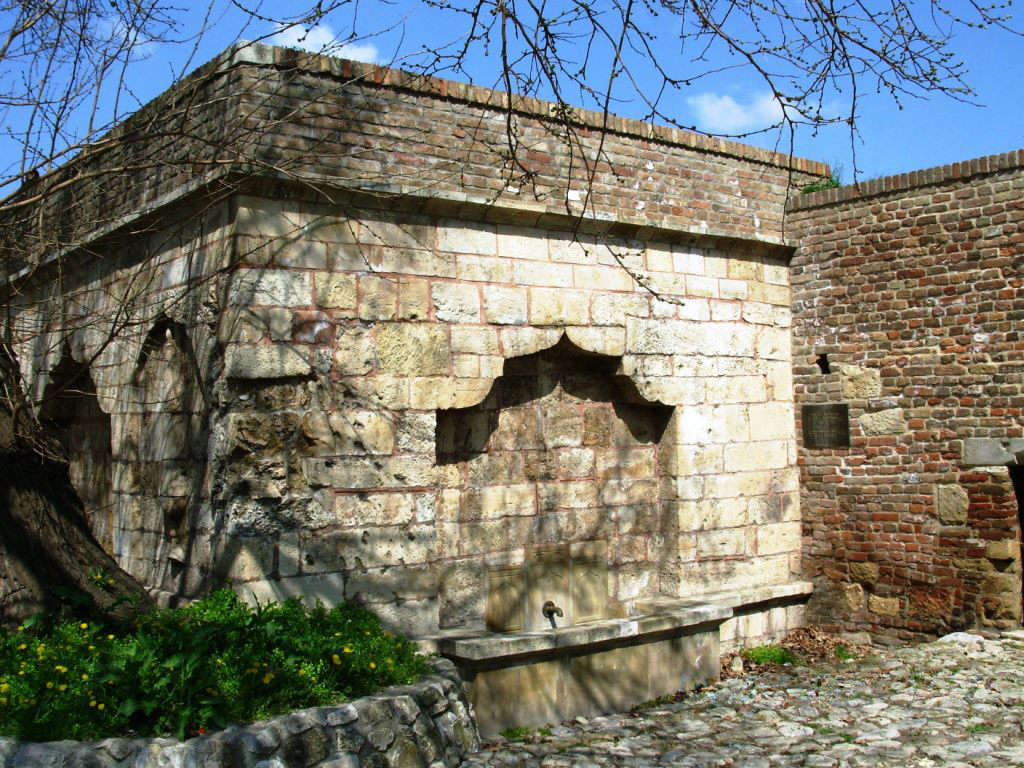
Mehmed Paša Sokolović's Fountain, Belgrade, 1576/77

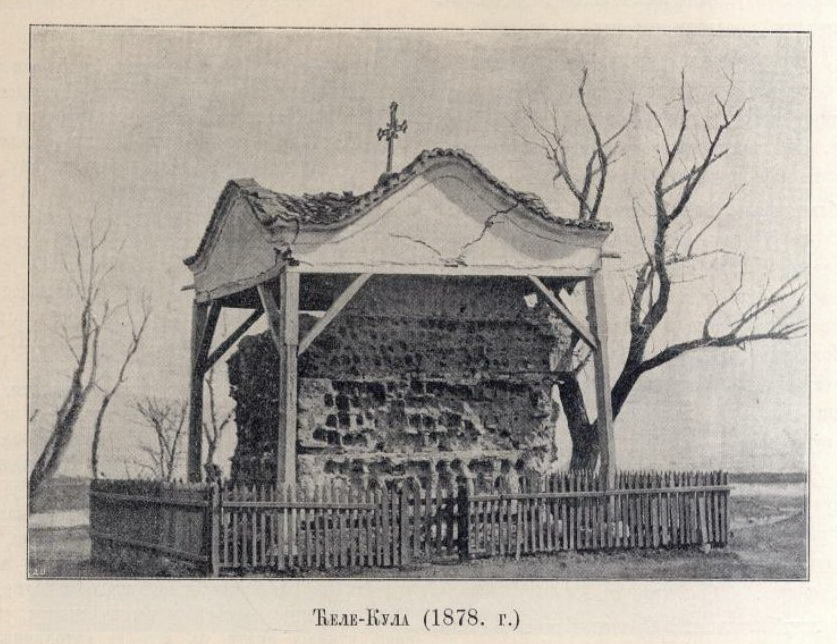
Skull Tower, Belgrade, 1809

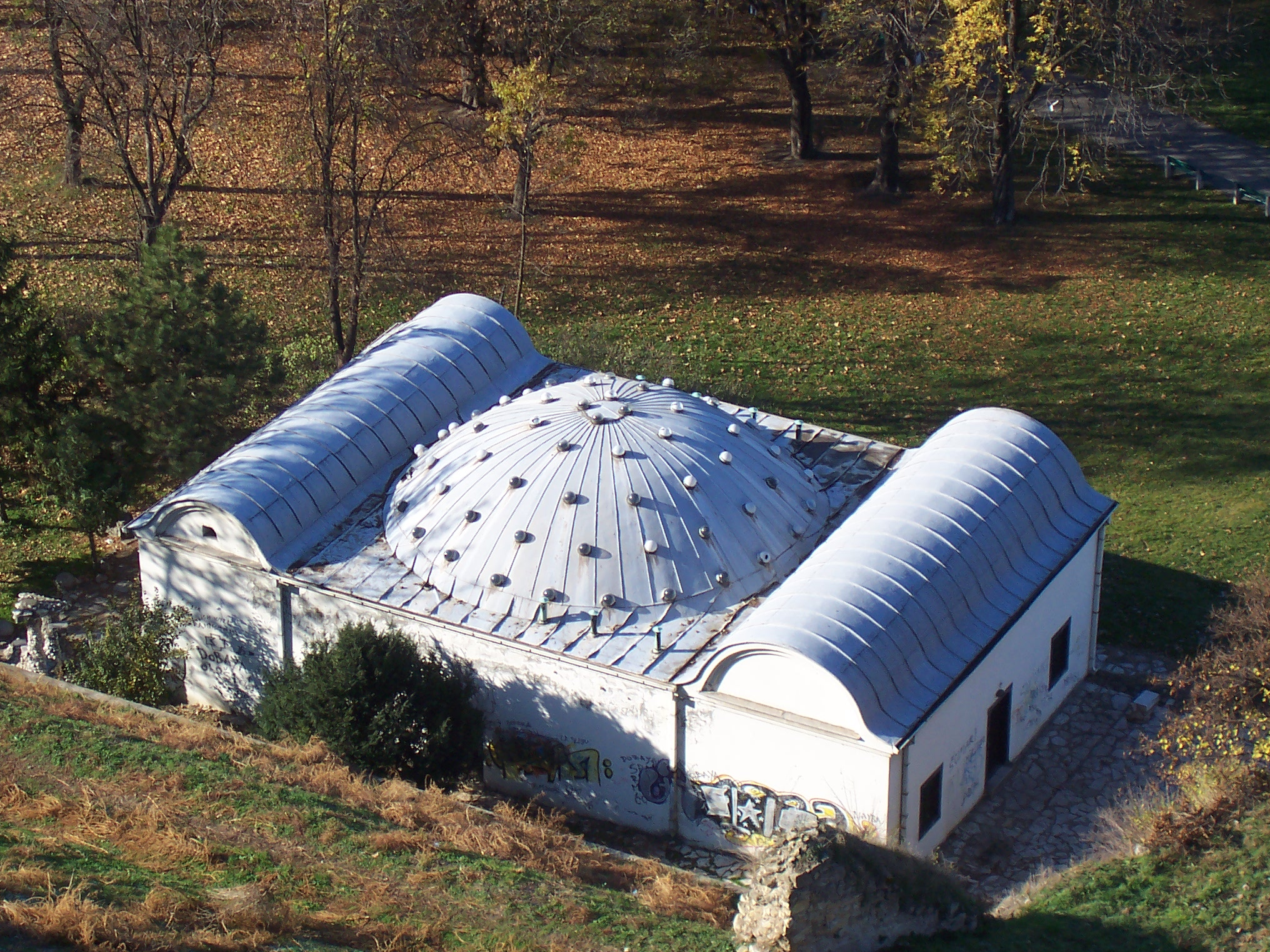
Old hammam (bathhouse) in Lower Town, 1860–1867, today Belgrade Planetarium

== Modernity ==
During the 17th century many of the Serbian Orthodox Churches that were built in Belgrade took all the characteristics of Baroque churches built in the Austrian administered regions where Serbs lived. The churches usually had a bell tower, and a single nave building with the iconostasis inside the church covered with Renaissance-style paintings. These churches can mostly be found in Zemun.

The 19th century was a time of development of Serbian nationalism, which sought to develop a "national style" in architecture too, in line with national romanticism ideas. Within the broader movement of historicism, in parallel to neoclassical architecture, Serbia saw the development in particular of a Byzantine Revival architecture style.

In the 19th century the city completely transformed from an oriental town to the contemporary architecture of the time, with influences from neoclassicism, romanticism and academic art. Serbian architects took over the development from the foreign builders in the late 19th century, producing the National Theatre, Stari Dvor, Cathedral of Saint Archangel Michael and later, in the early 20th century, the House of the National Assembly and National Museum of Serbia, influenced by Art Nouveau. Elements of Neo-Byzantine architecture are present in buildings such as the Vuk Foundation House, the Old Post Office in Kosovska street, and sacral architecture, such as Church of Saint Mark and the Church of Saint Sava.

Early 19th-century architecture
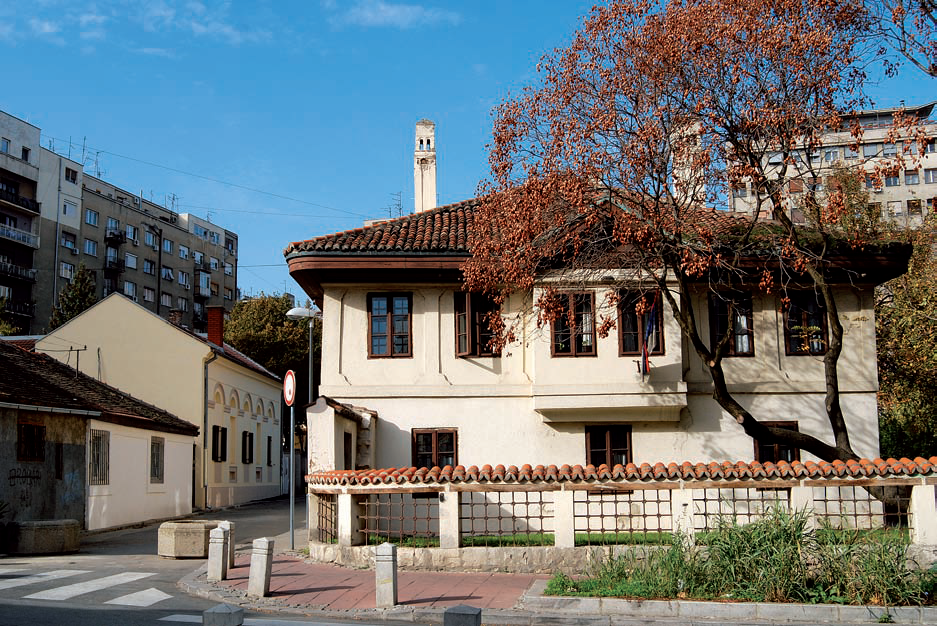
Dositej Lyceum, a typical building of 18th-century Belgrade

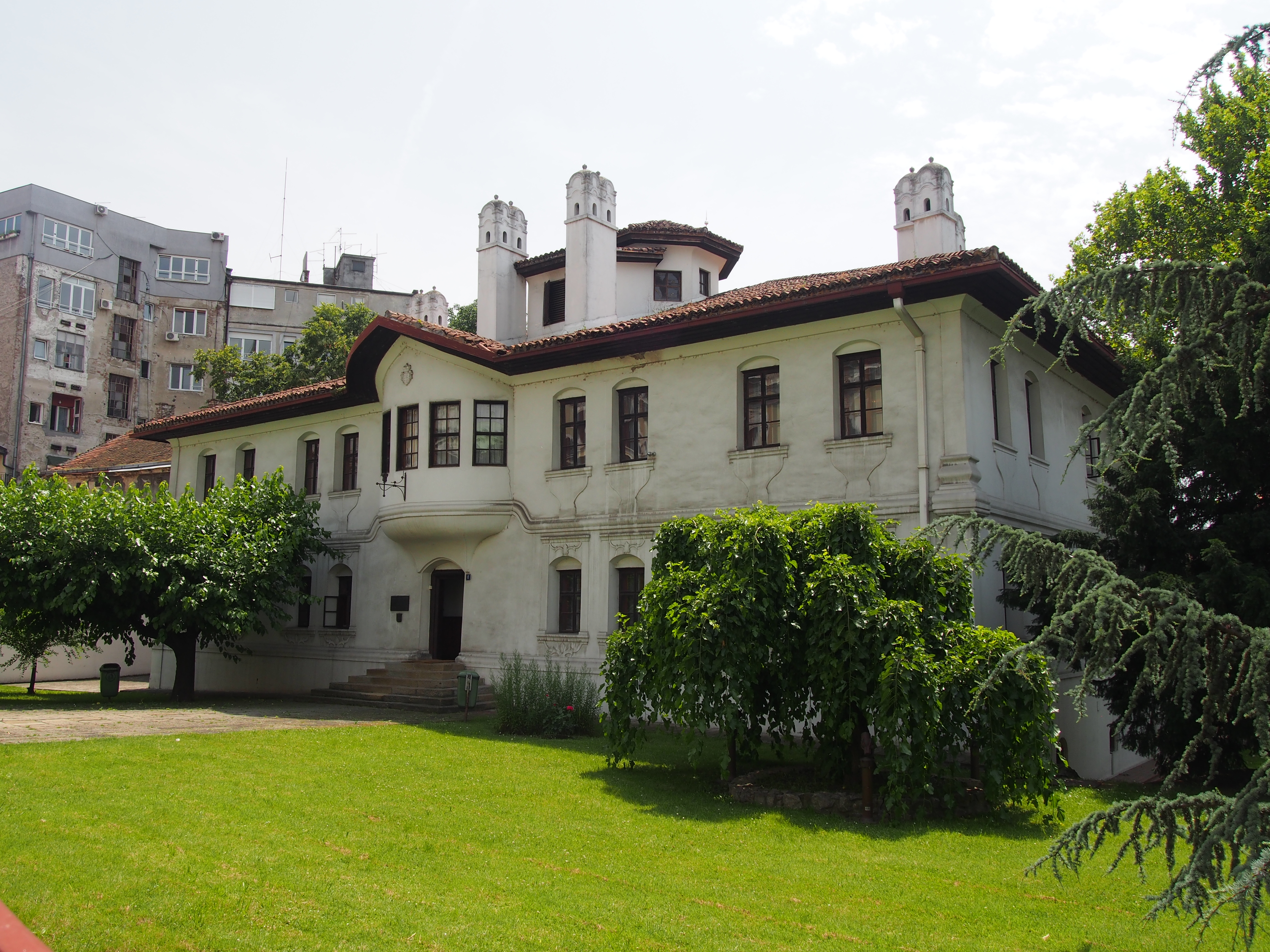
Residence of Princess Ljubica by Hadži-Neimar, 1830

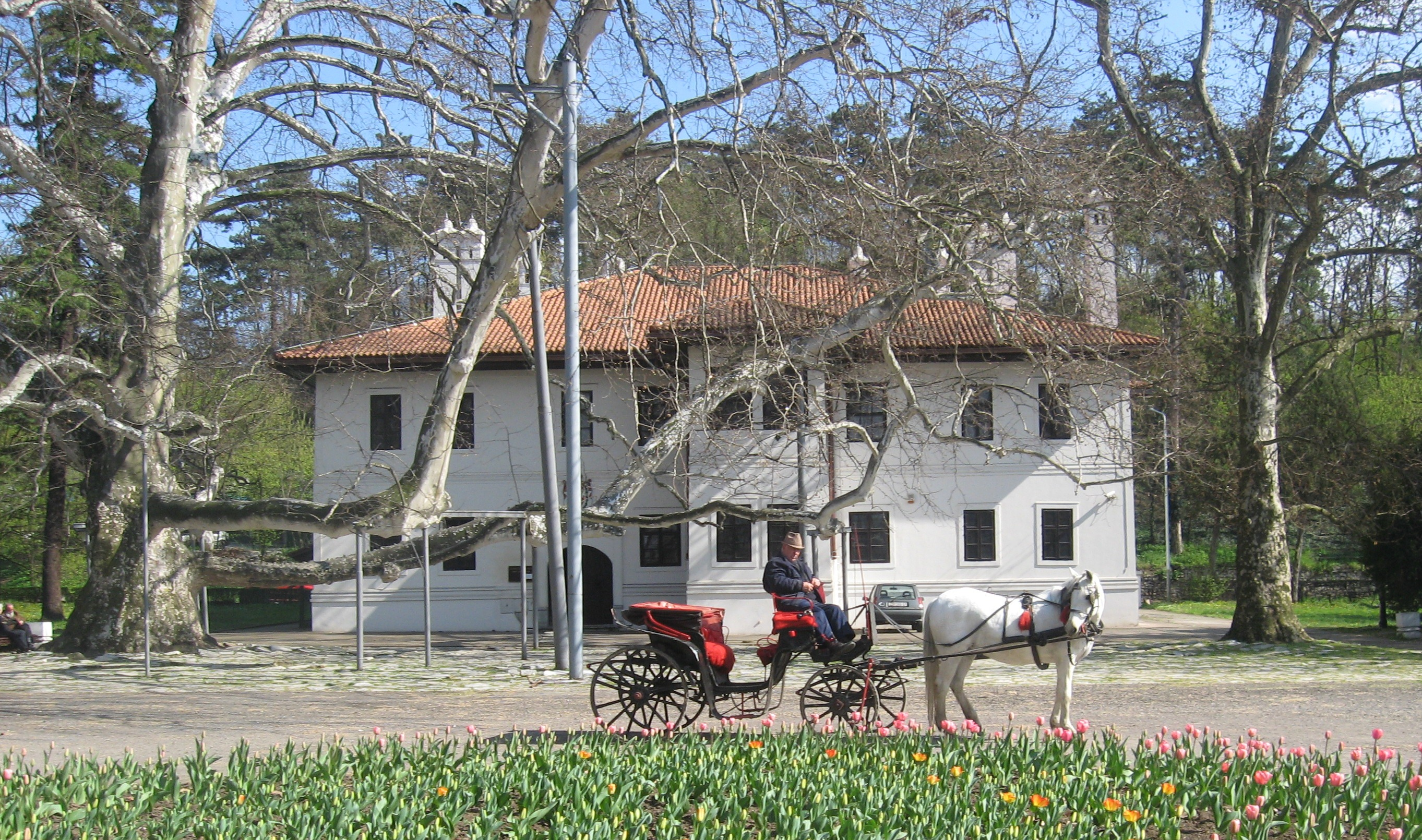
Residence of Prince Miloš by Hadži-Neimar, 1831-1833

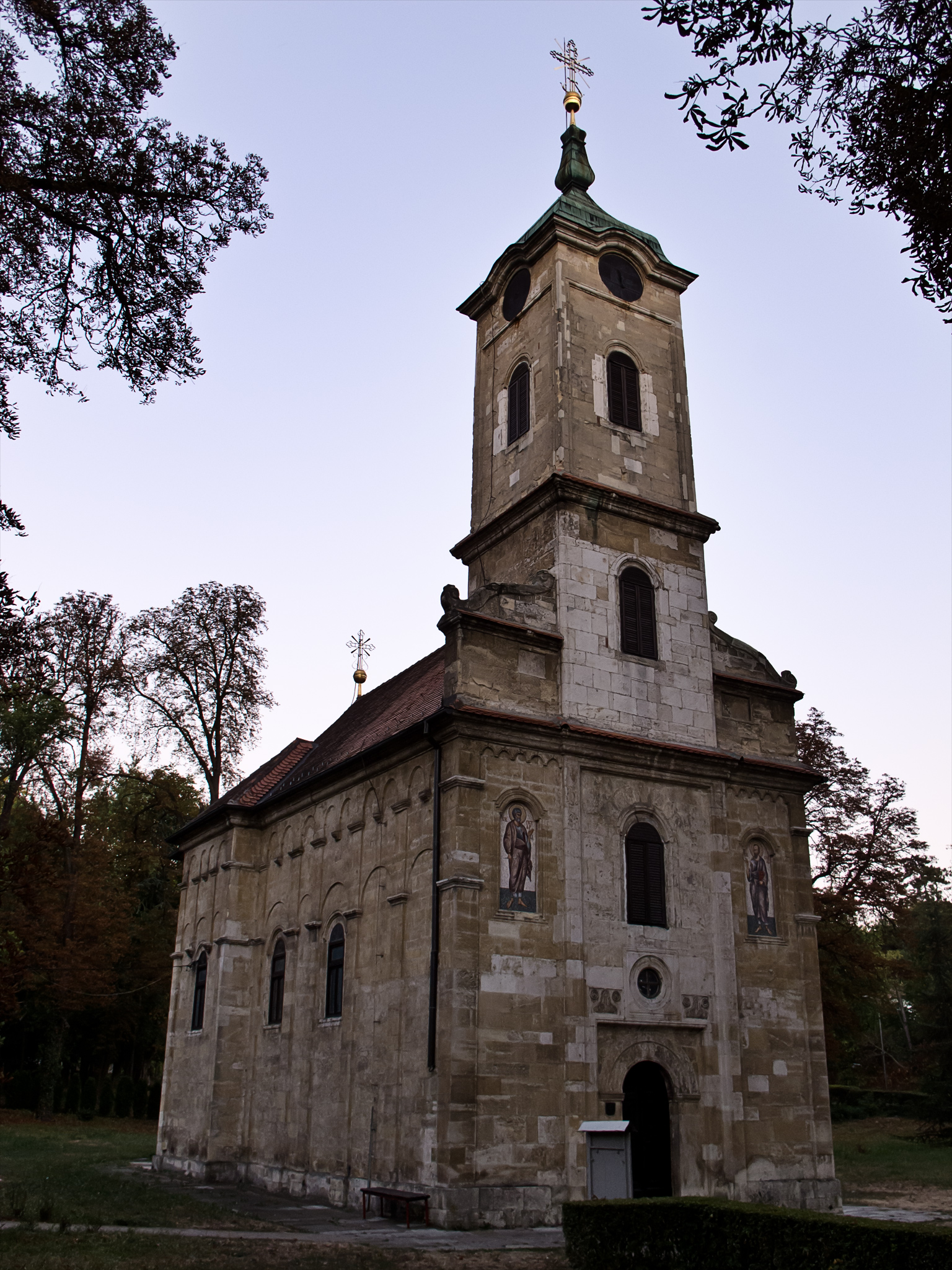
Church of the Holy Apostles Peter and Paul, Topčider by Hadži-Neimar, 1834
Academic style architecture
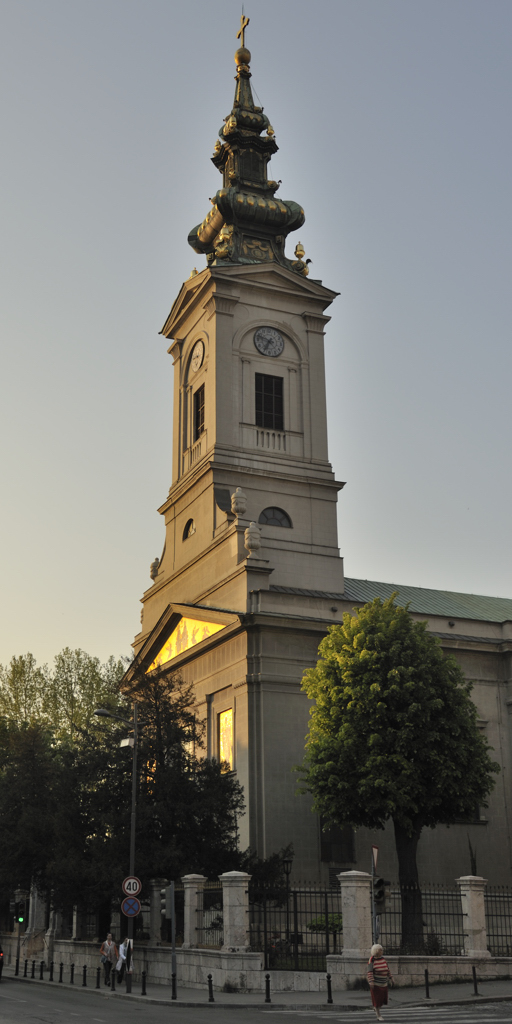
Cathedral of Saint Archangel Michael by Adam Friedrich Kwerfeld, 1837-1840

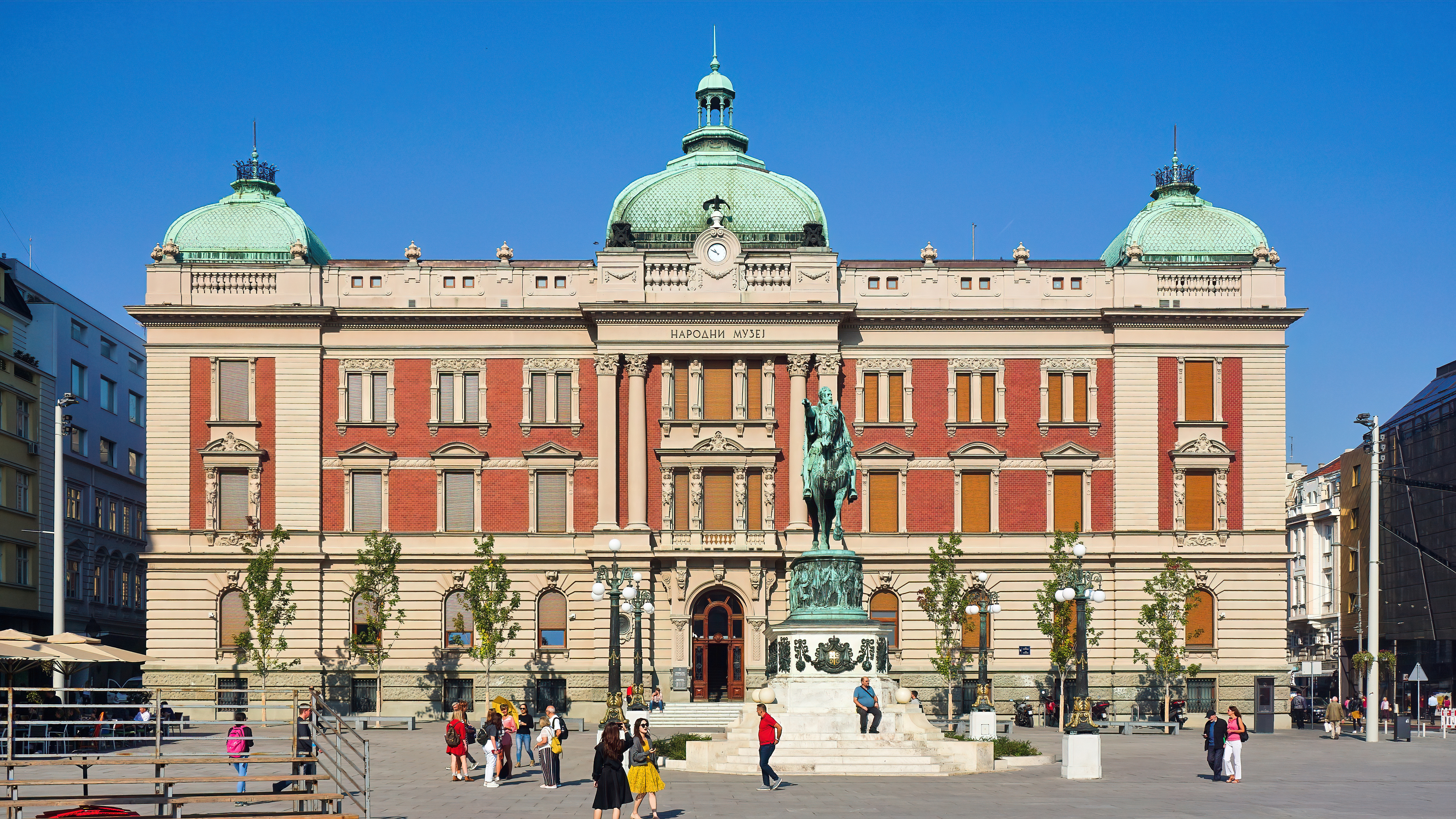
National Museum of Serbia by Andra Stevanović and Nikola Nestorović, 1844

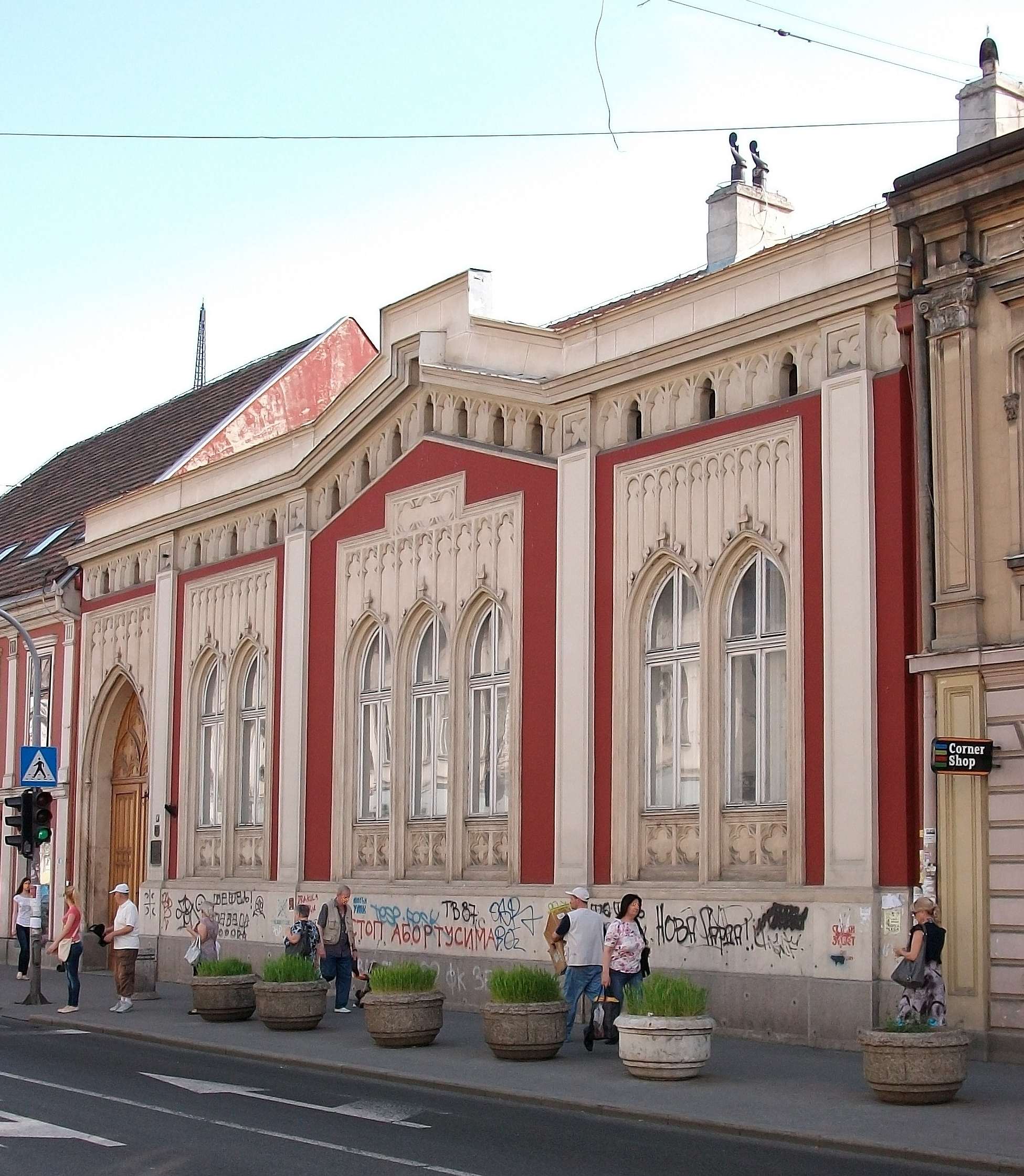
Spirta House by Heinrich von Ferstel, 1855

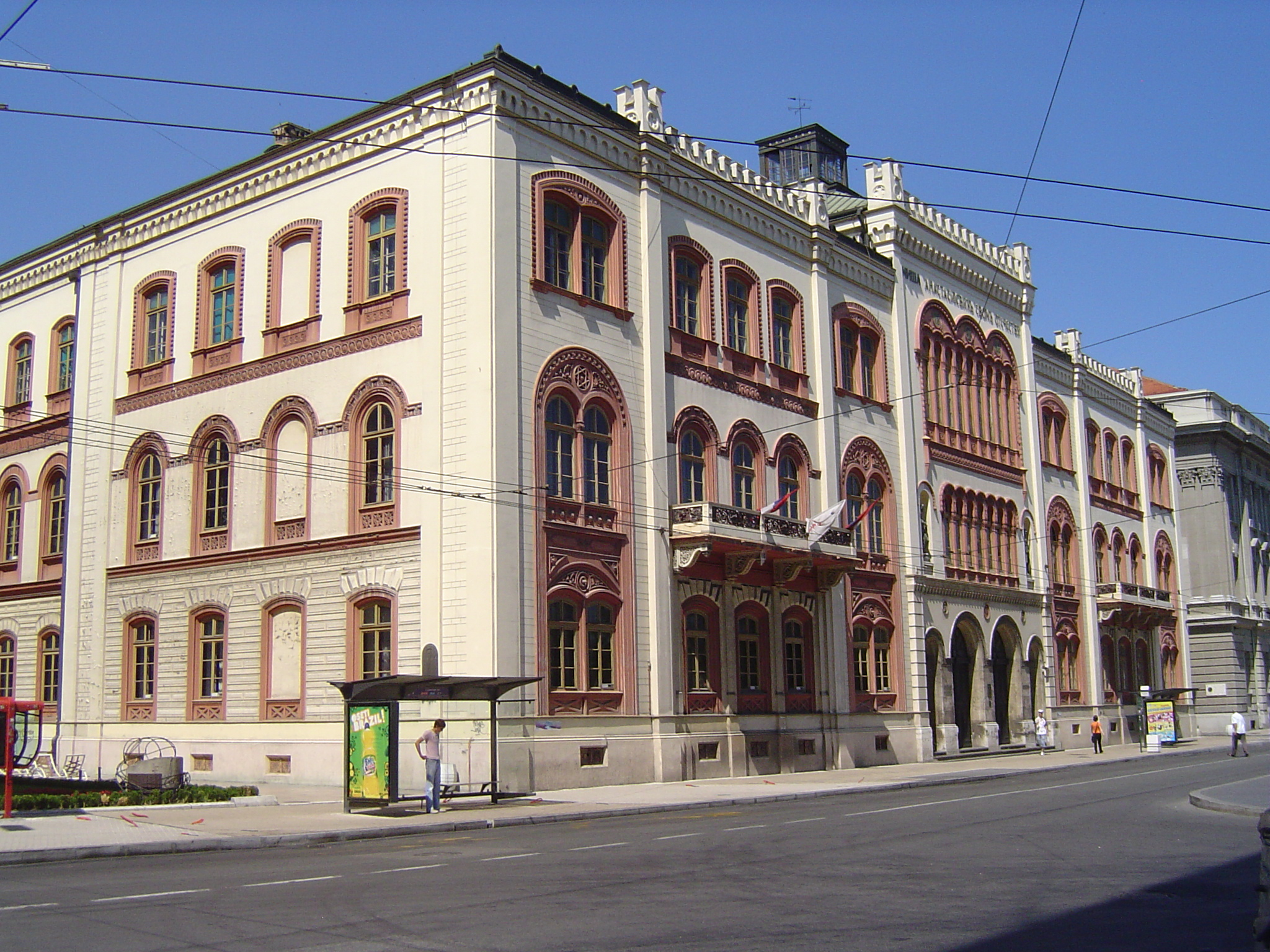
Captain Miša Mansion by Jan Nevole, 1863

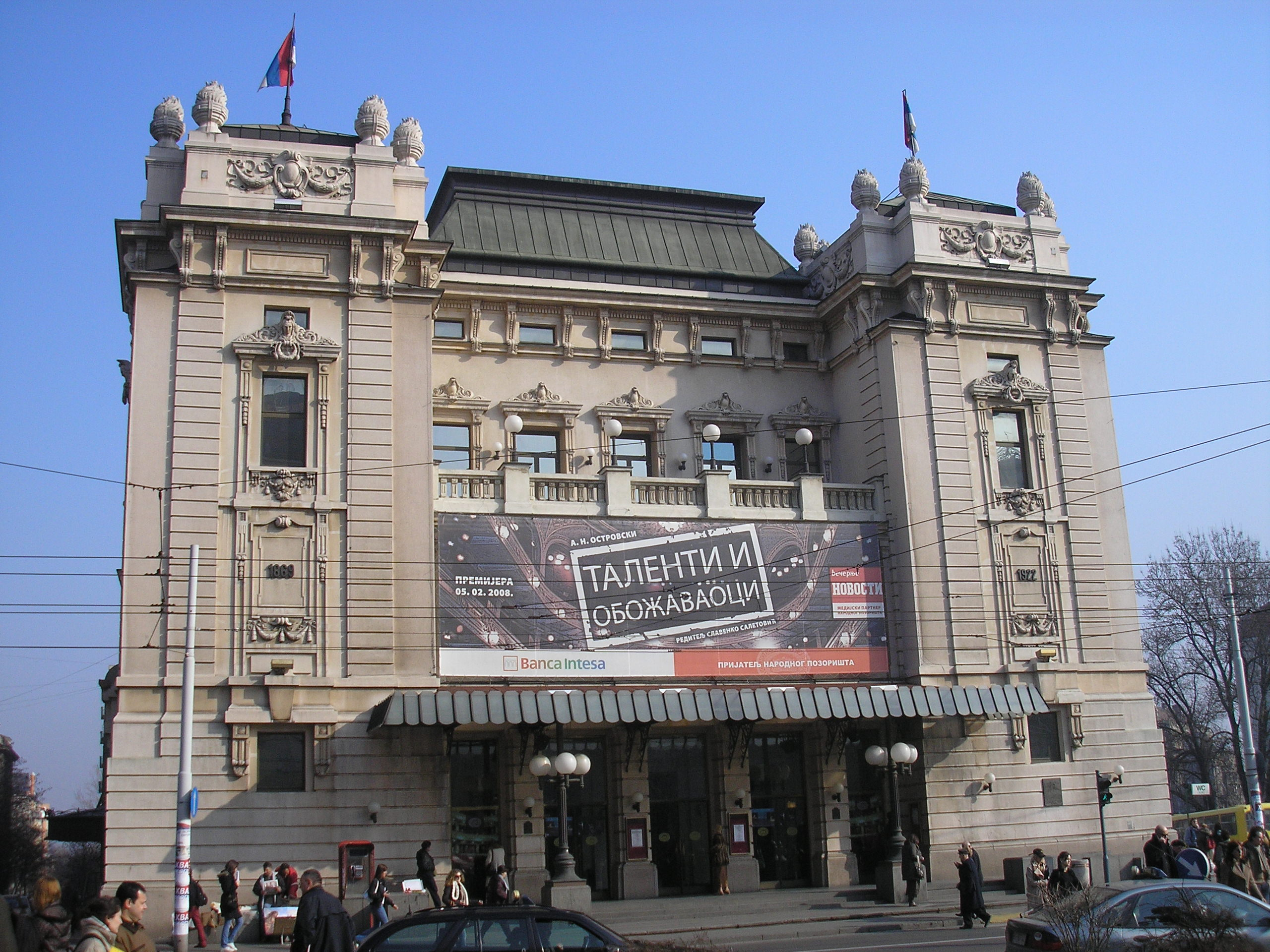
National Theatre by Aleksandar Bugarski, 1869

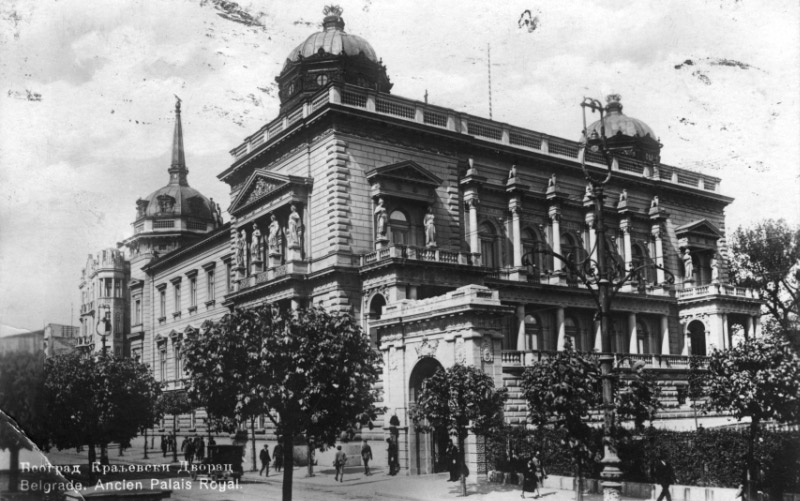
Stari Dvor (Old Palace) by Aleksandar Bugarski, 1884

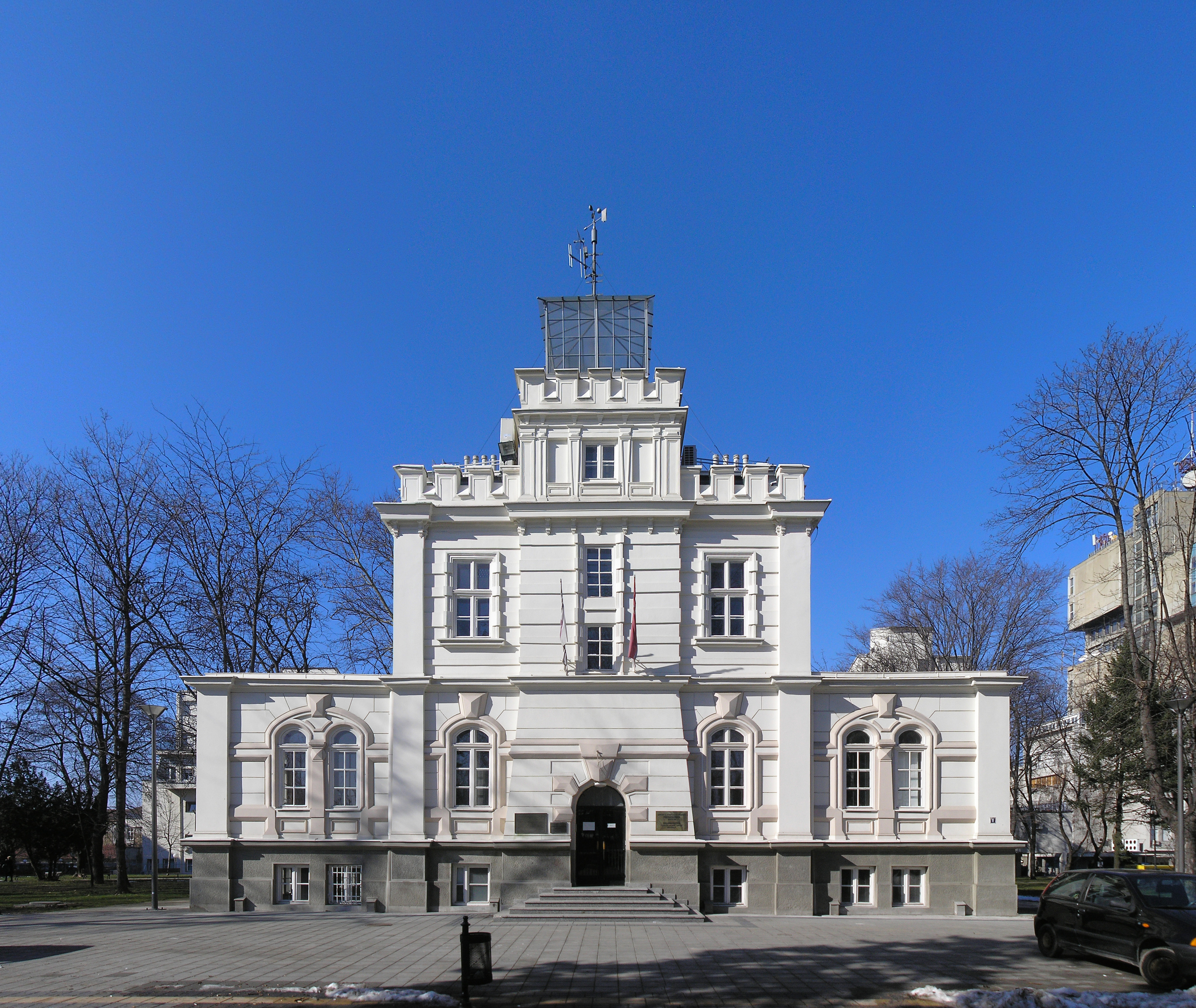
First Serbian Observatory, 1890

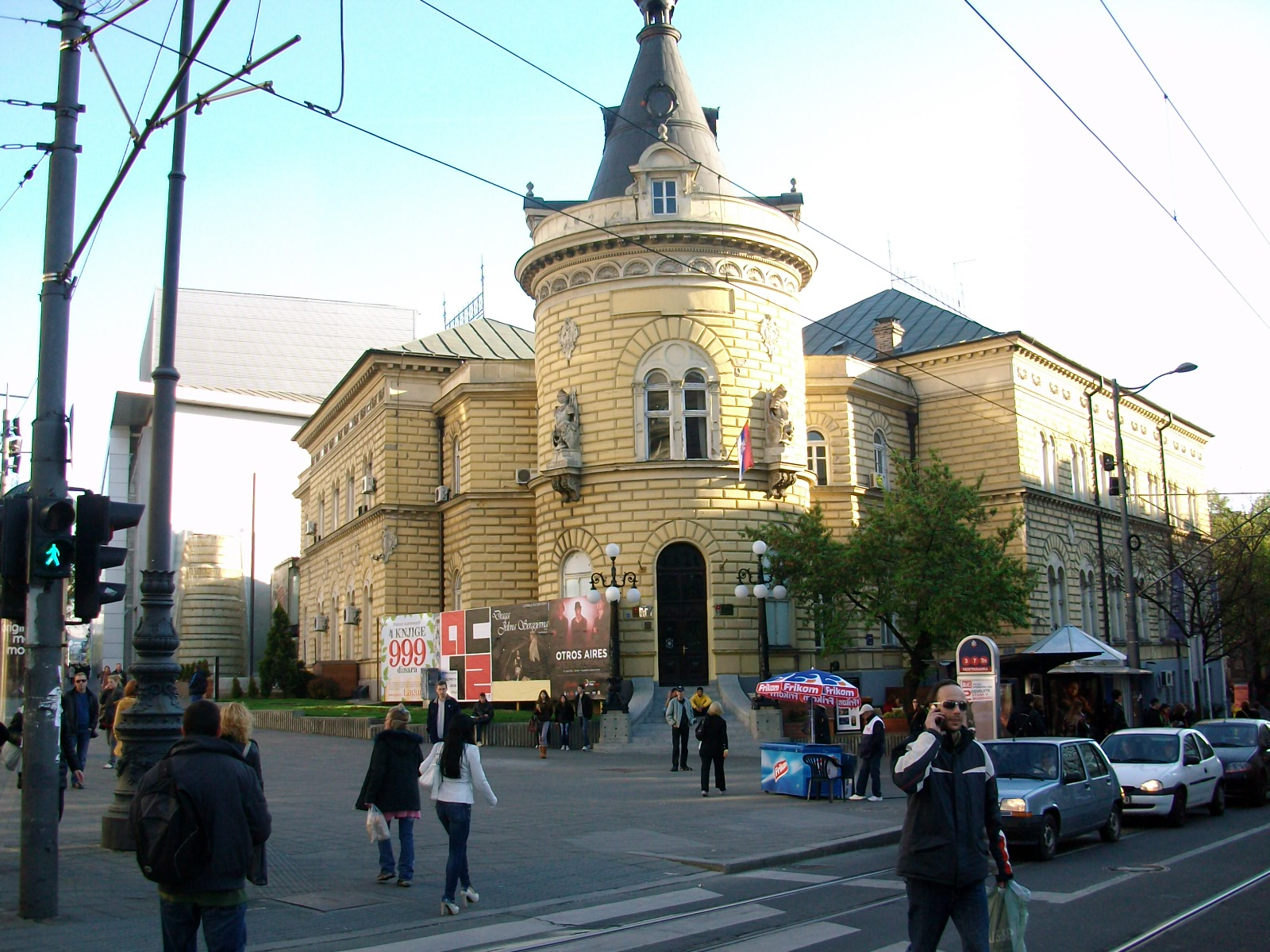
Officers Club, 1895

=== Byzantine Revival architecture ===
Serbia's modern sacral architecture got its main impetus from the dynastic burial church in Oplenac which was commissioned by the Karadordevic dynasty 1909. With the arrival of Russian émigré artist after the October Revolution, Belgrade's main governmental edifices were planned by eminent Russian architects trained in Russia. It was King Aleksandar I who was the patron of the neobyzantine movement. Its main proponents were Aleksander Deroko, Momir Korunovic, Branko Kristic, Grigorijji Samojlov and Nikola Krasnov (Никола́й Петро́вич Красно́в). Their main contribution were the royal castles on Dedinje, the Church of Saint Sava, St. Mark's Church, Belgrade. After the communist era ended Mihailo Mitrovic and Nebojša Popovic were proponents of new tendencies in sacral architecture which used classic examples in the Byzantine tradition.

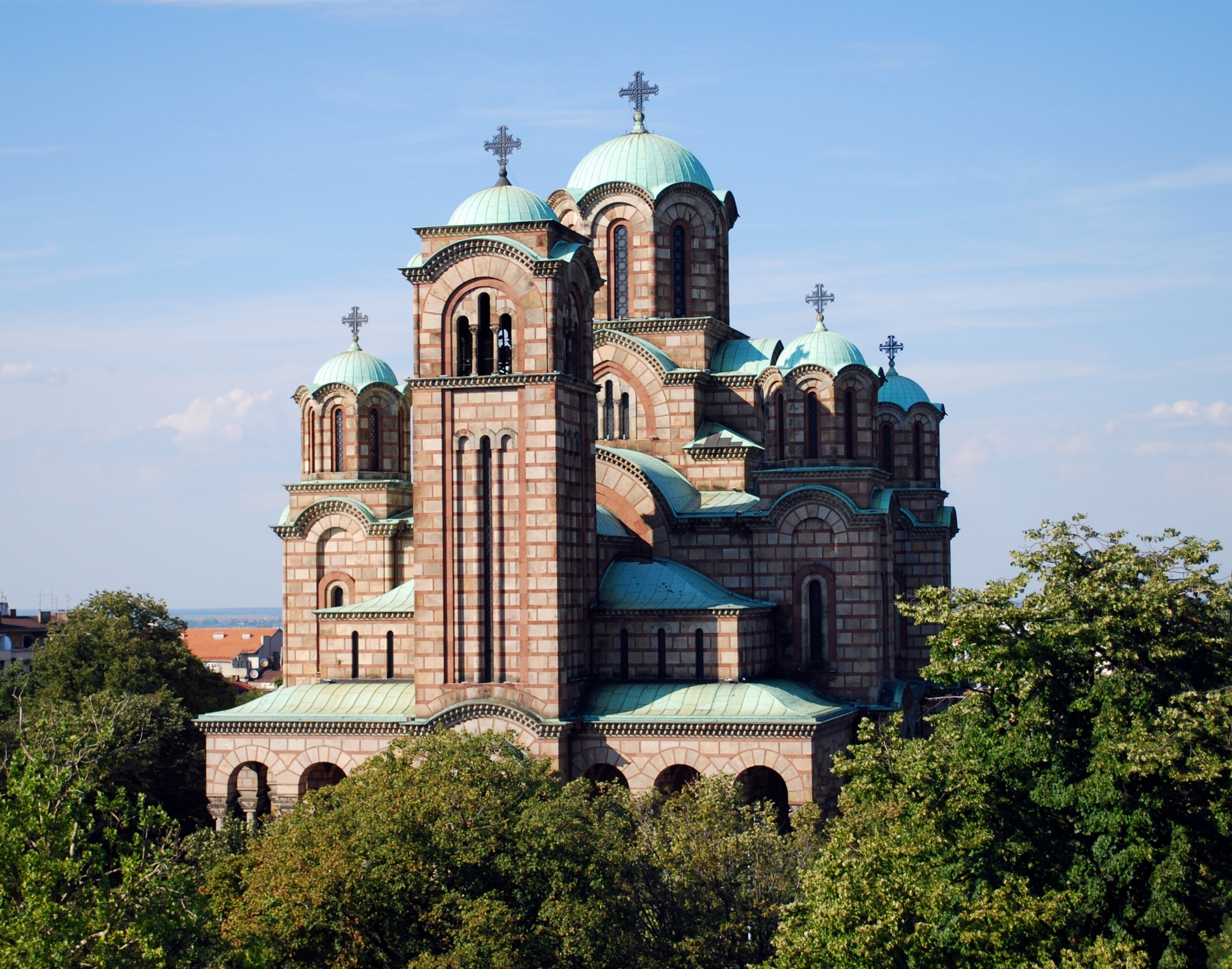
Church of Saint Mark, 1940

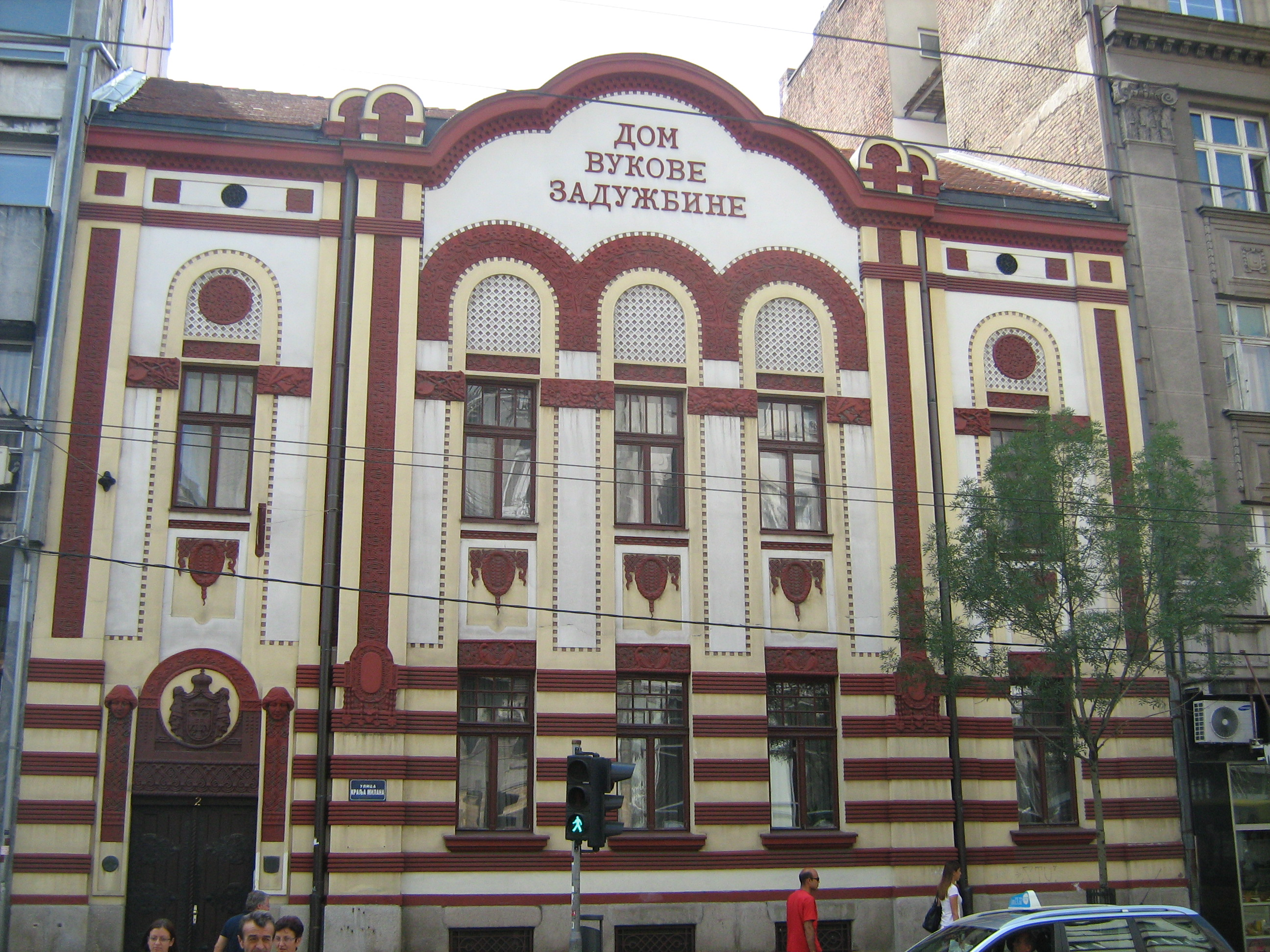
Vuk Foundation House by Branko Tanazevic

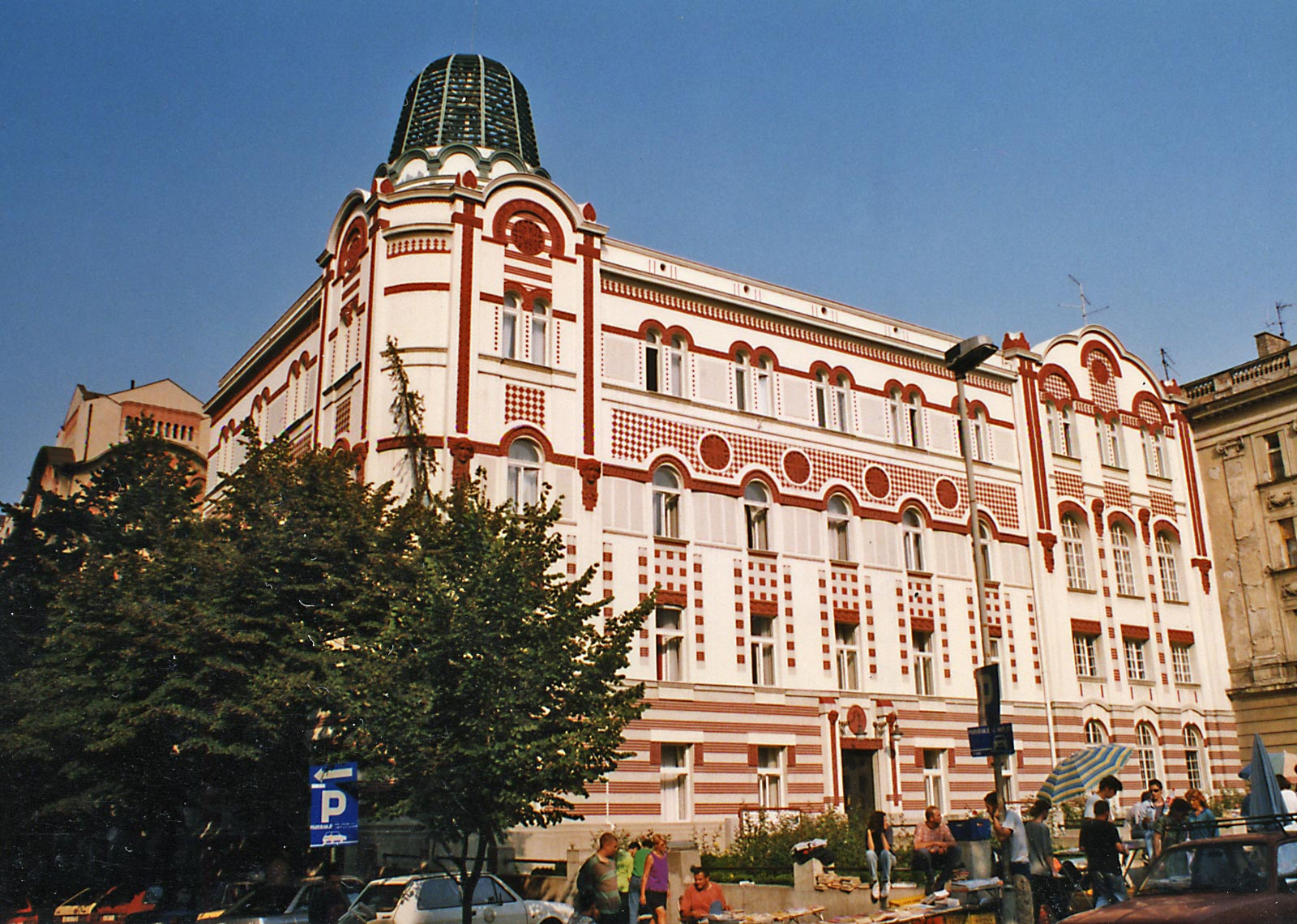
Old telephone exchange by Branko Tanazevic

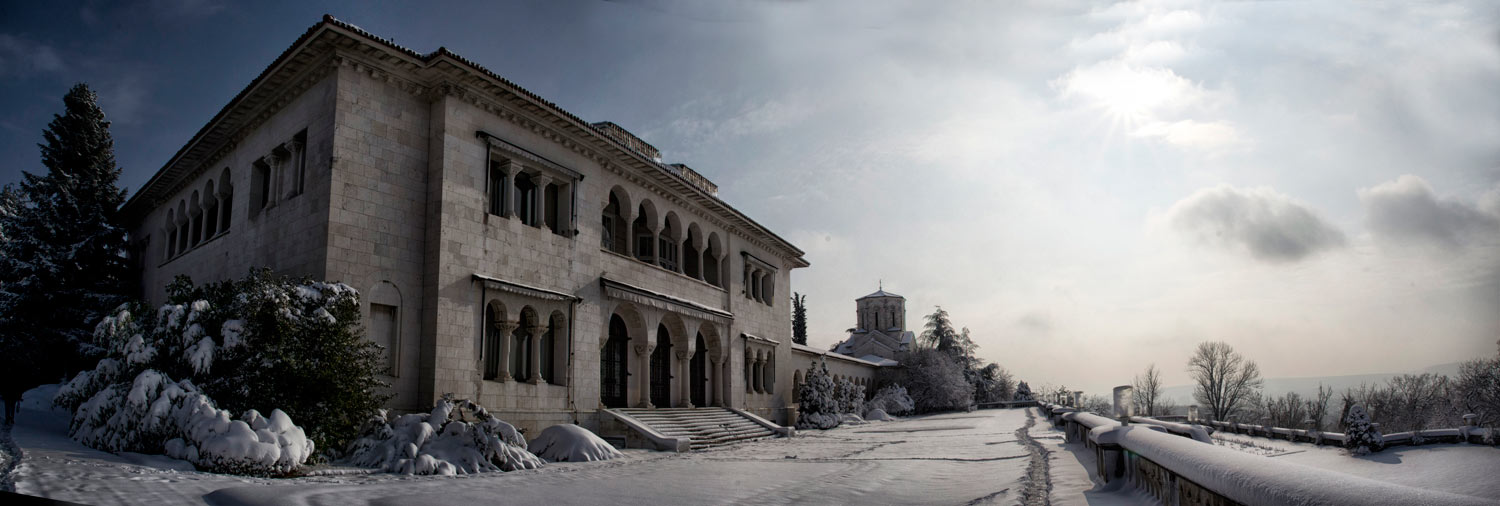
Kraljevski Dvor (Royal Palace) at Dedinje, 1924–1929

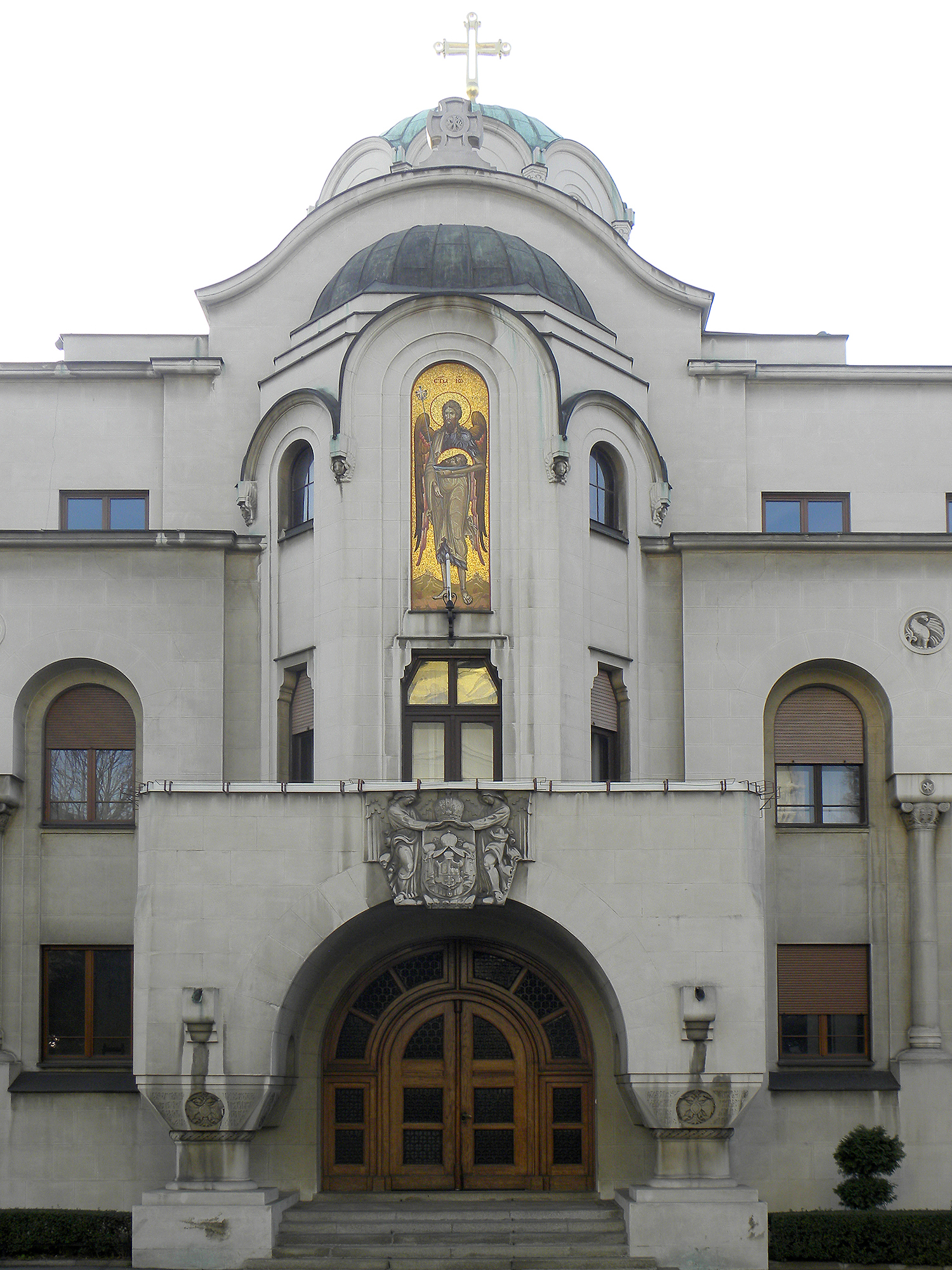
Palace of the Patriarchate by Viktor Lukomski, 1932–1935

=== Art Nouveau and Secession style ===
The Art Nouveau and Vienna Secession style flourished in the north of the country at the turn of the 20th century, when the Vojvodina region was still part of the Hungarian kingdom under the Habsburgs. Subotica and Zrenjanin host particularly remarkable buildings from the period. Novi Sad and Belgrade were not immune from the architectural novelty either.

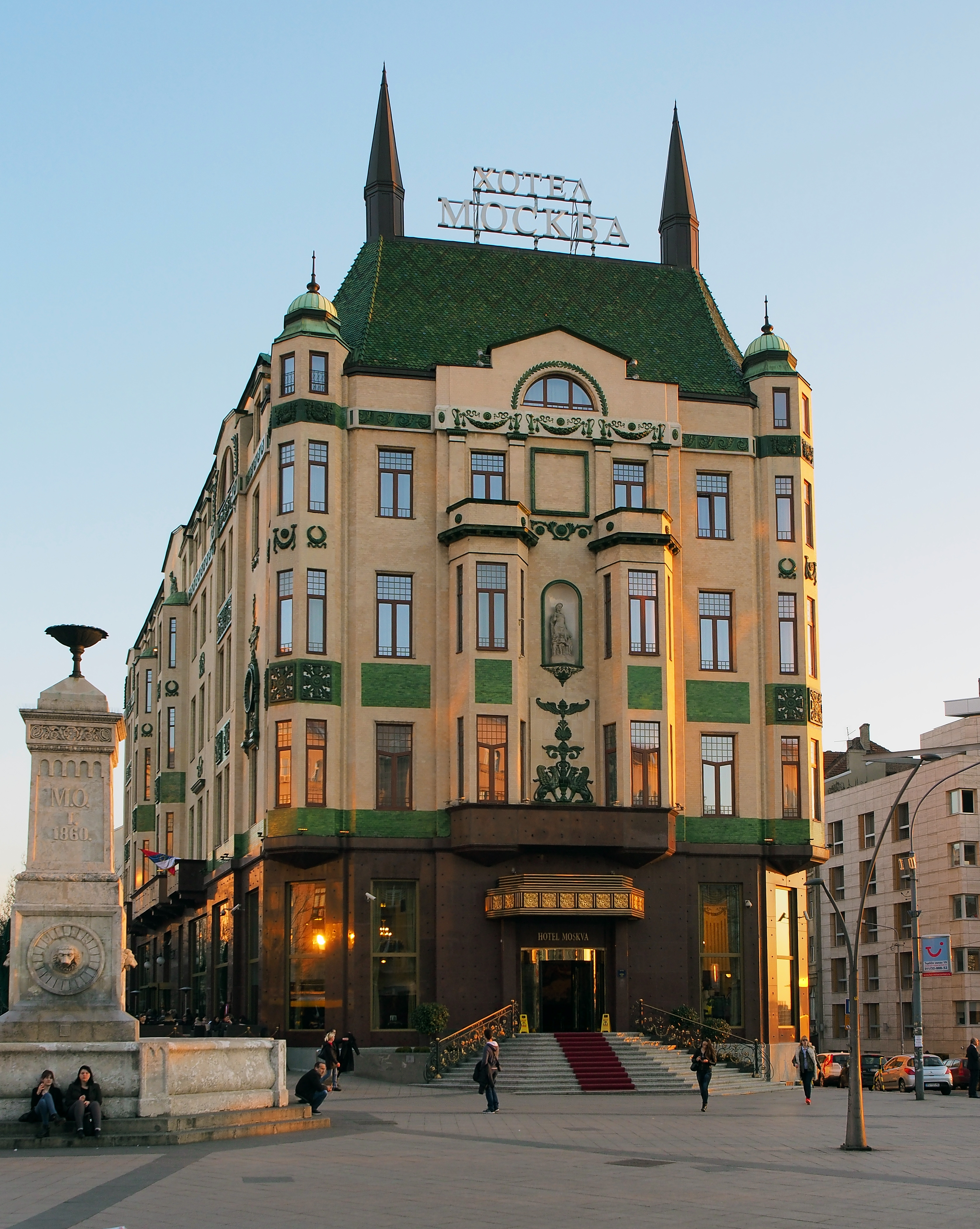
Hotel Moskva by Jovan Ilkić, 1908

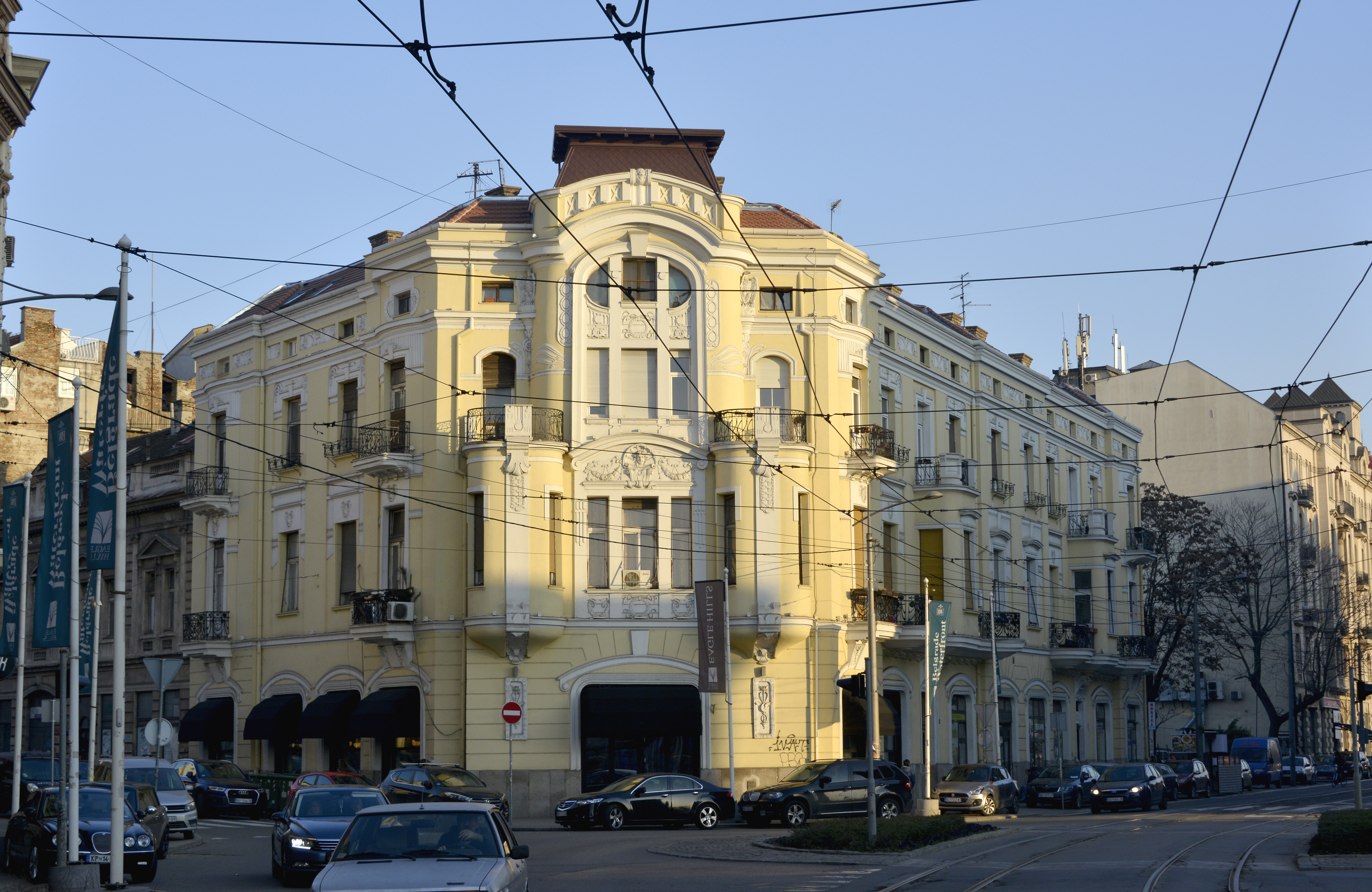
Vučo House on the Sava River, 1908

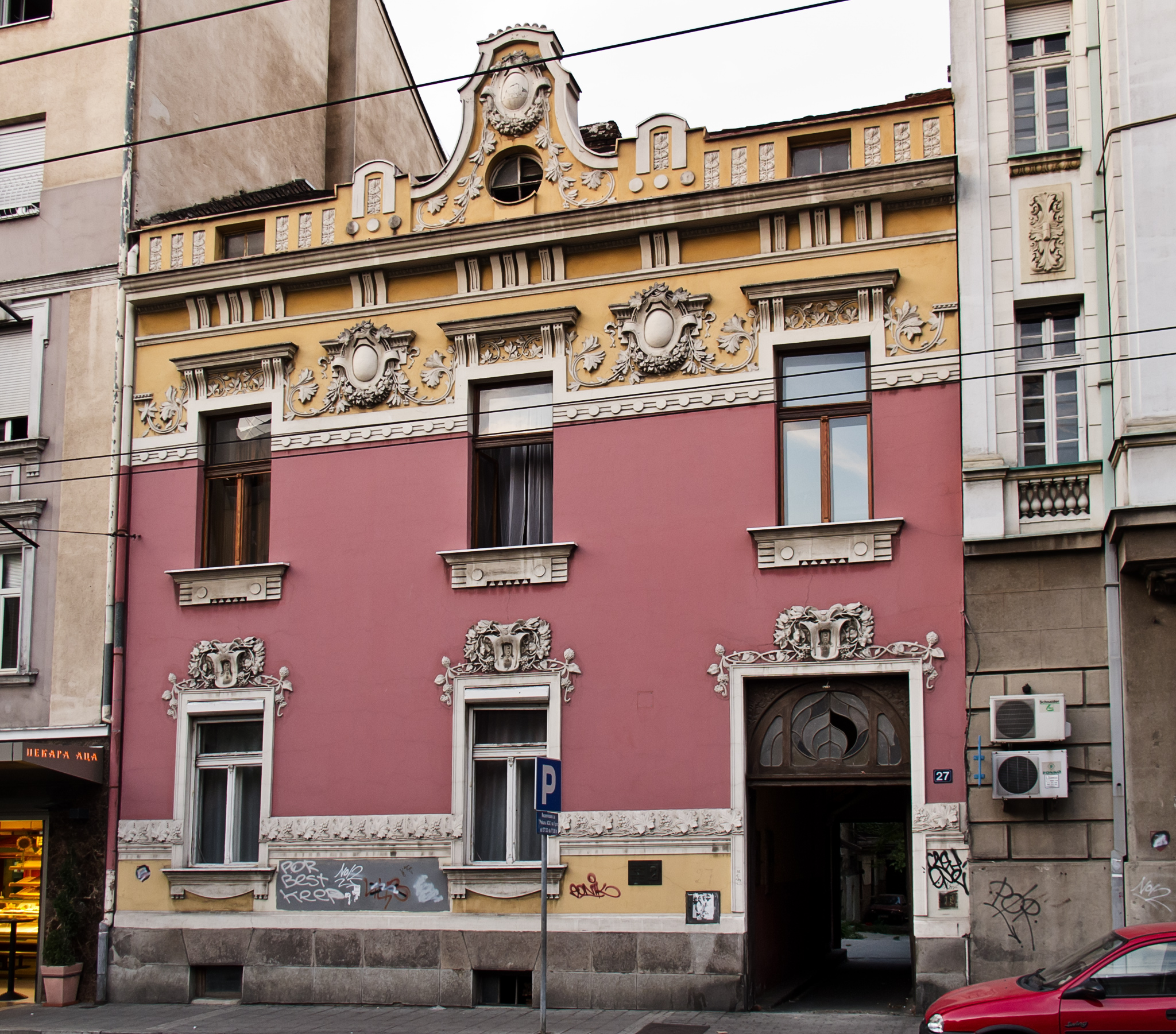
Uroš Predić Studio, 1908

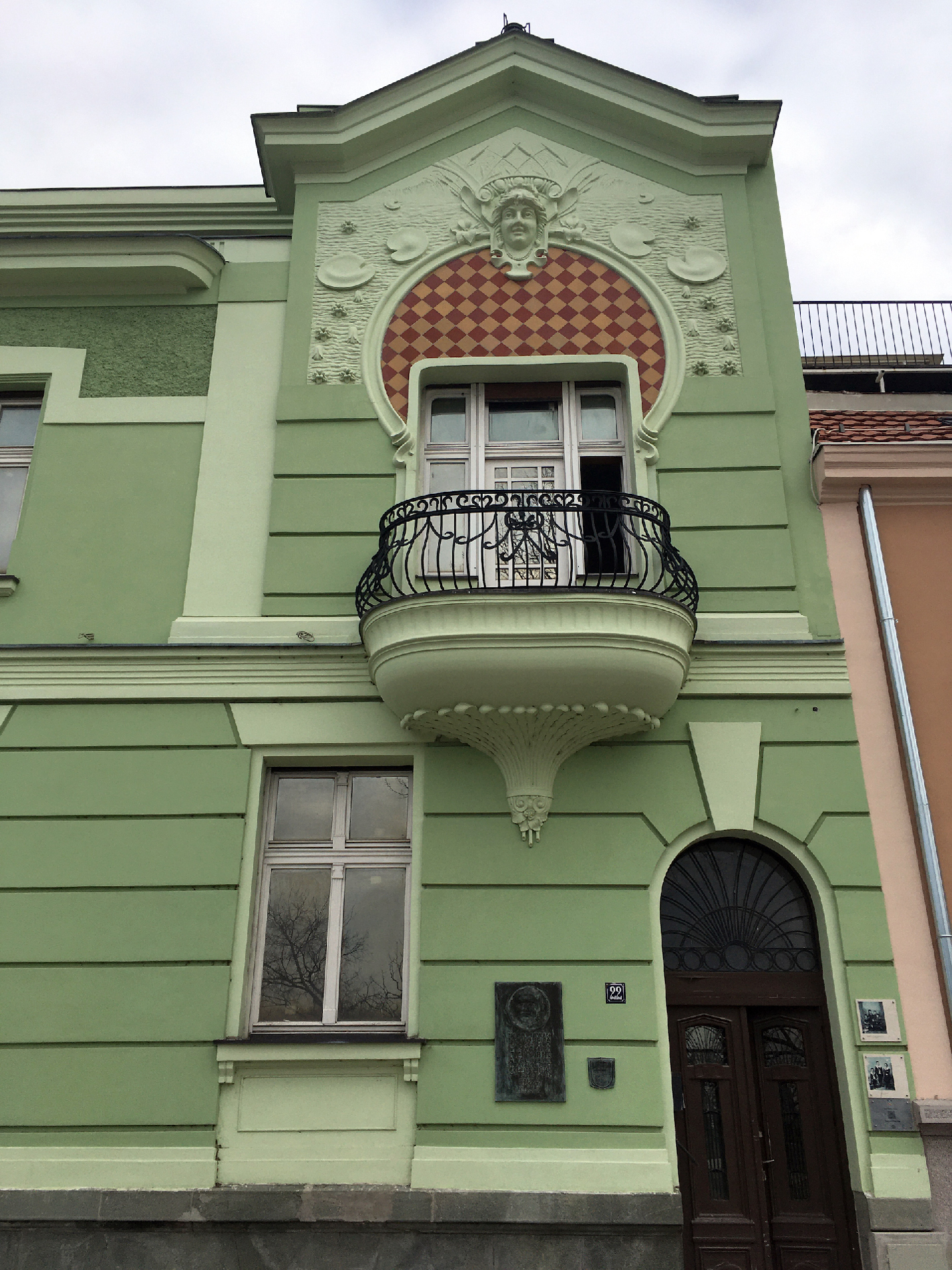
Mika Alas House, 1910

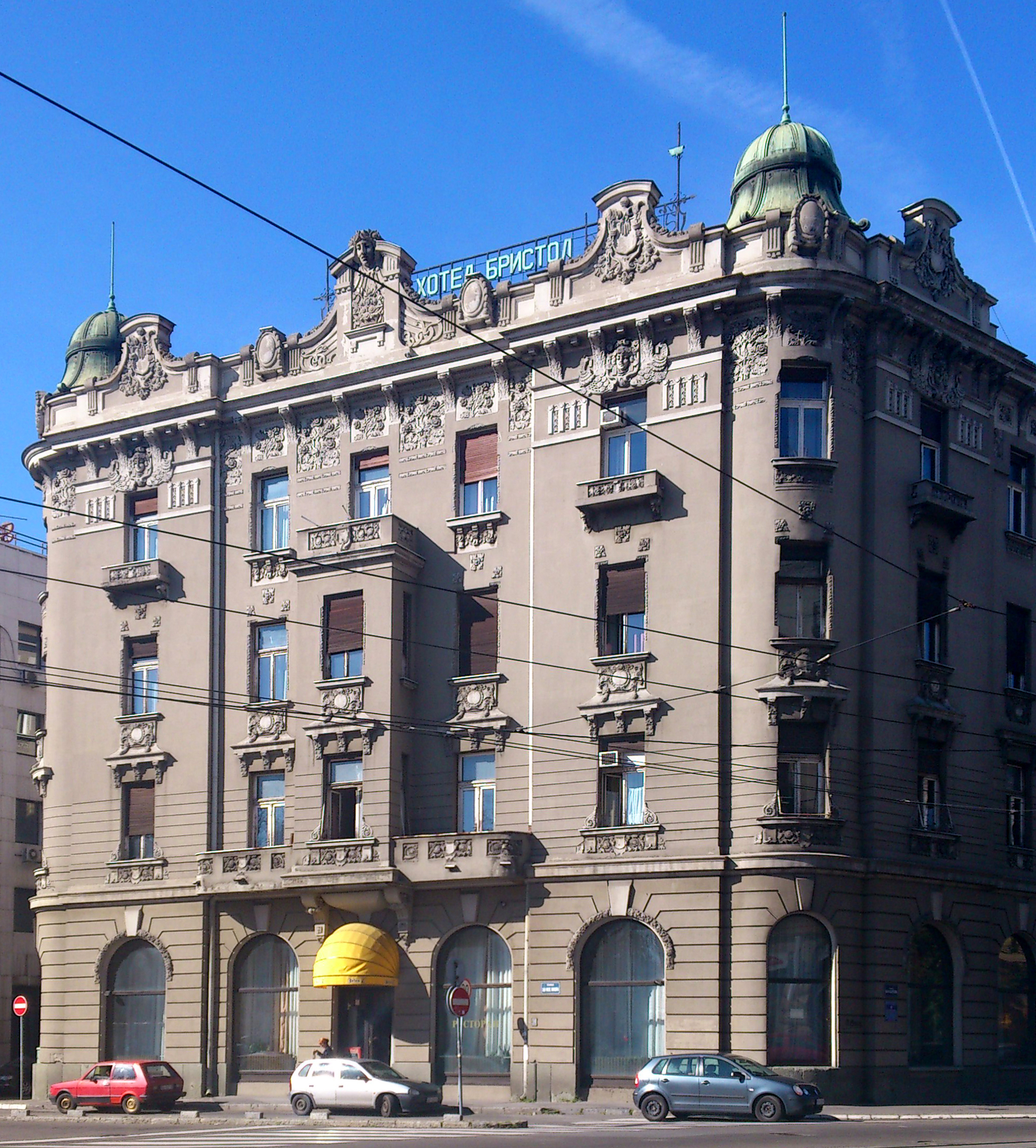
Secession style Hotel Bristol by Nikola Nestorović, 1912

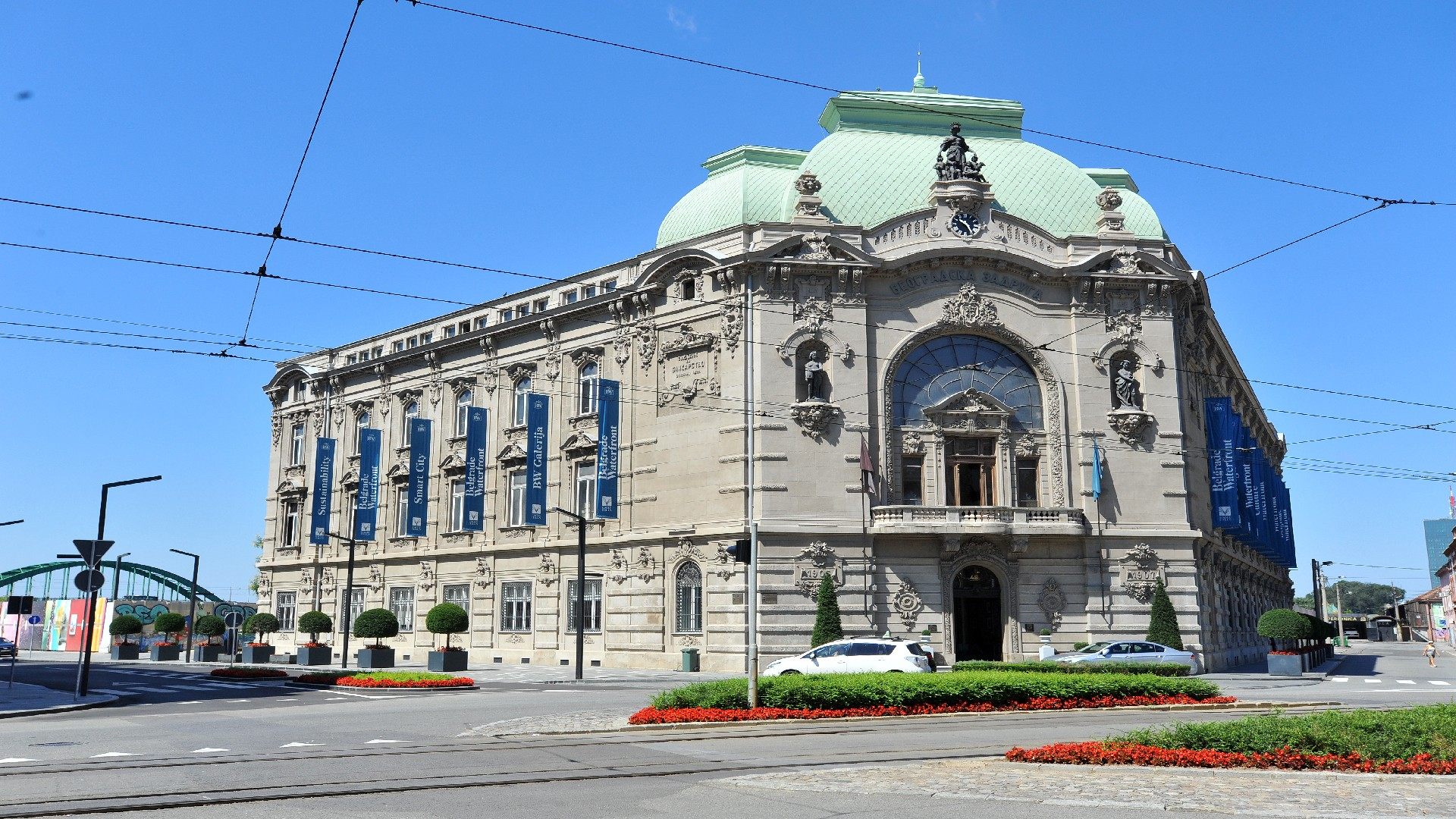
Belgrade Cooperative, 1882

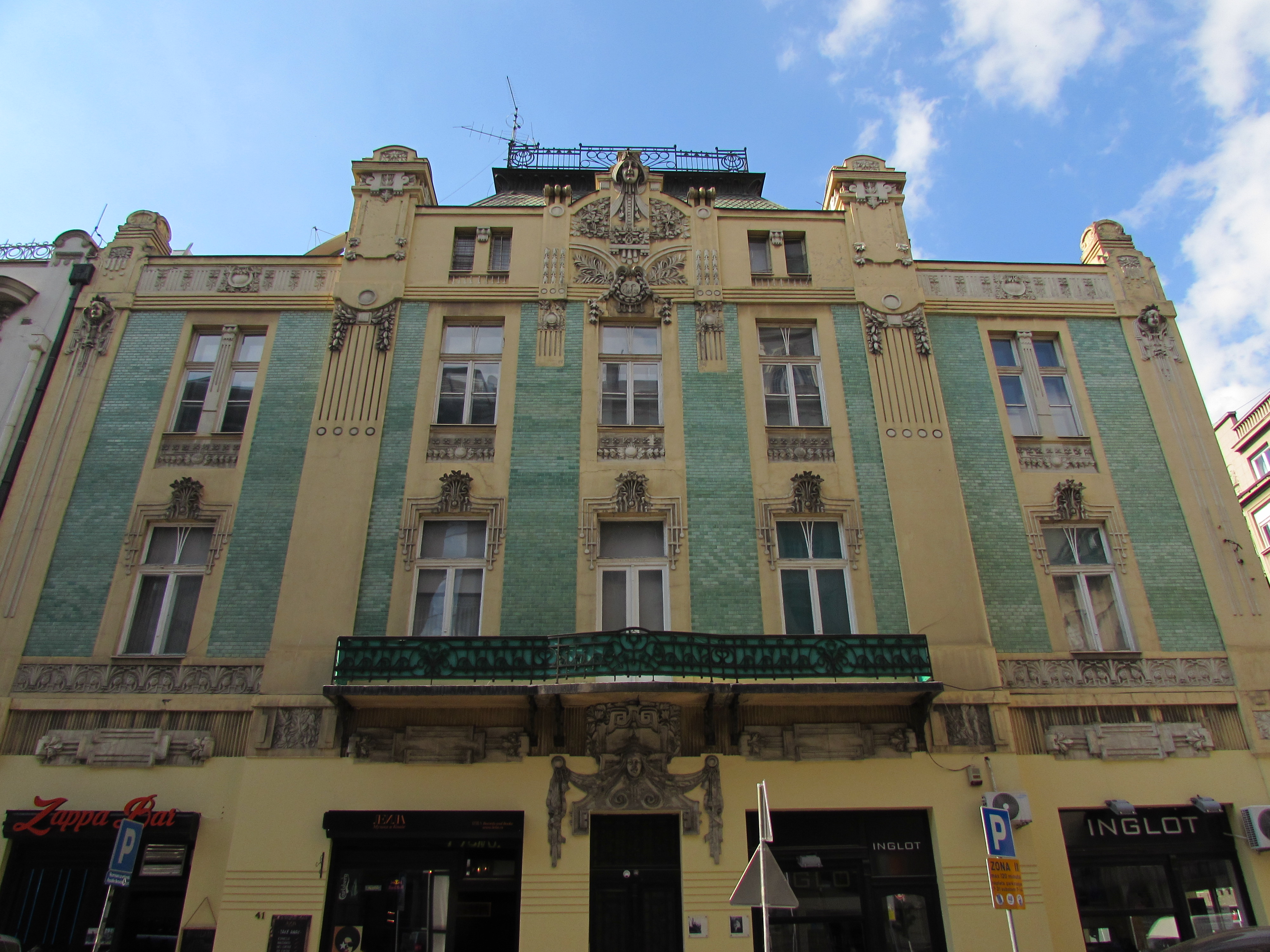
Building of Merchant Stamenković by Andra Stevanović and Nikola Nestorović, 1907

== Interwar and Socialist Yugoslavia ==
Yugoslav architecture emerged in the first decades of the 20th century before the establishment of the state; during this period a number of South Slavic creatives, enthused by the possibility of statehood, organized a series of art exhibitions in Serbia in the name of a shared Slavic identity. Following governmental centralization after the 1918 creation of the Kingdom of Yugoslavia, this initial bottom-up enthusiasm began to fade. Yugoslav architecture became more and more dictated by an increasingly concentrated national authority which sought to establish a unified state identity.

Beginning the 1920s, Yugoslav architects began to advocate for architectural modernism, viewing the style as the logical extension of progressive national narratives. The Group of Architects of the Modern Movement, an organization founded in 1928 by architects Branislav Ð Kojic, Milan Zlokovic, Jan Dubovy, and Dusan Babic pushed for the widespread adoption of modern architecture as the "national" style of Yugoslavia to transcended regional differences. Despite these shifts, differing relationships to the west made the adoption of modernism inconsistent in Yugoslavia WWII. Of all Yugoslav cities, Belgrade has highest concentration of modernist structures.

The architecture of Yugoslavia was characterized by emerging, unique, and often differing national and regional narratives. As a socialist state remaining free from the Iron Curtain, Yugoslavia adopted a hybrid identity that combined the architectural, cultural, and political leanings of both Western liberal democracy and Soviet communism.

During the socialist period in Belgrade much housing was built quickly and cheaply to house the huge influx of people from the countryside following World War II, resulting in the brutalist architecture of New Belgrade's blokovi (blocks); a socrealism trend briefly ruled, resulting in buildings like the Dom Sindikata. However, in the mid-1950s, the modernist trends took over, and still dominate the Belgrade architecture.

Interwar modernism
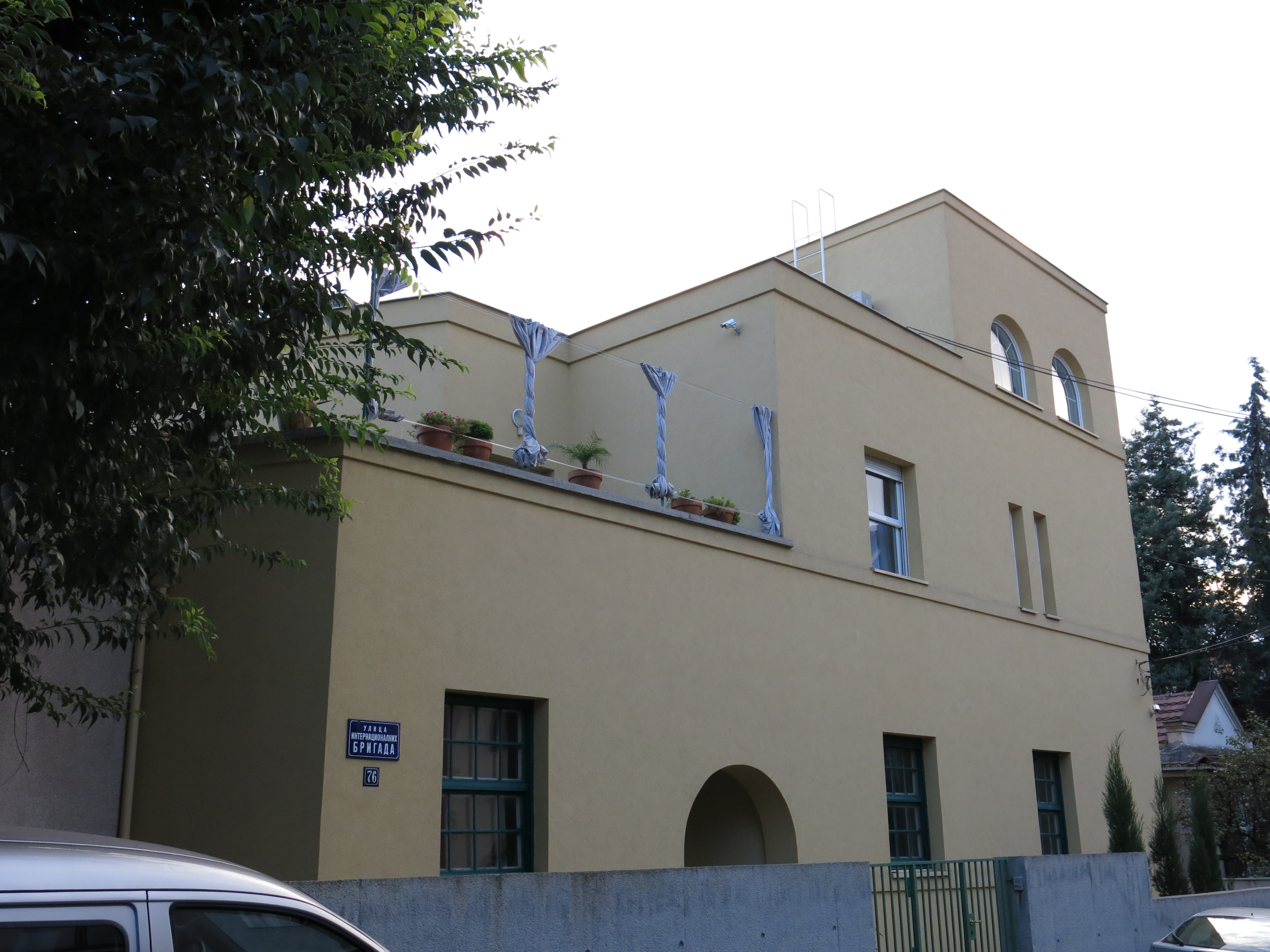
Zloković House in Belgrade, 1927

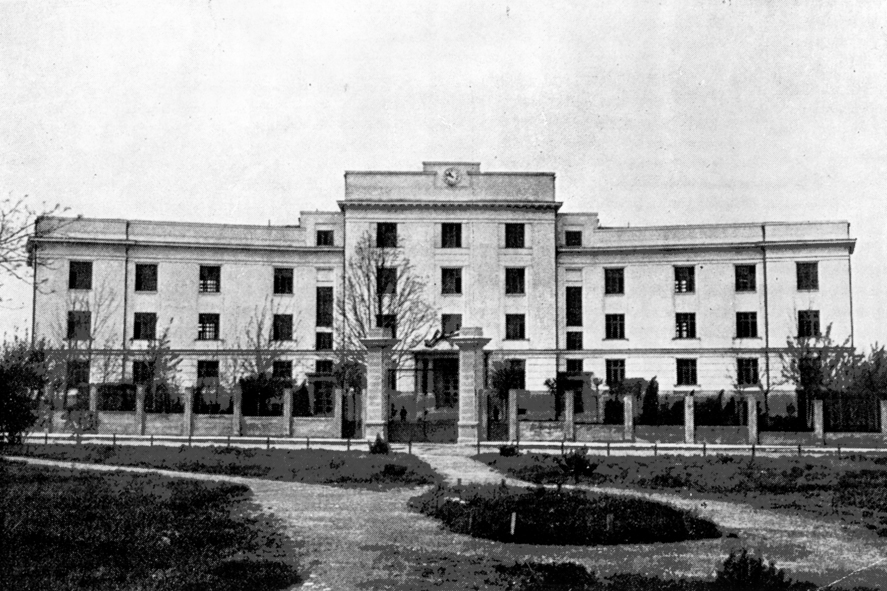
Studentski Dom by Vojin Petrovic, 1933, today Archives of Yugoslavia

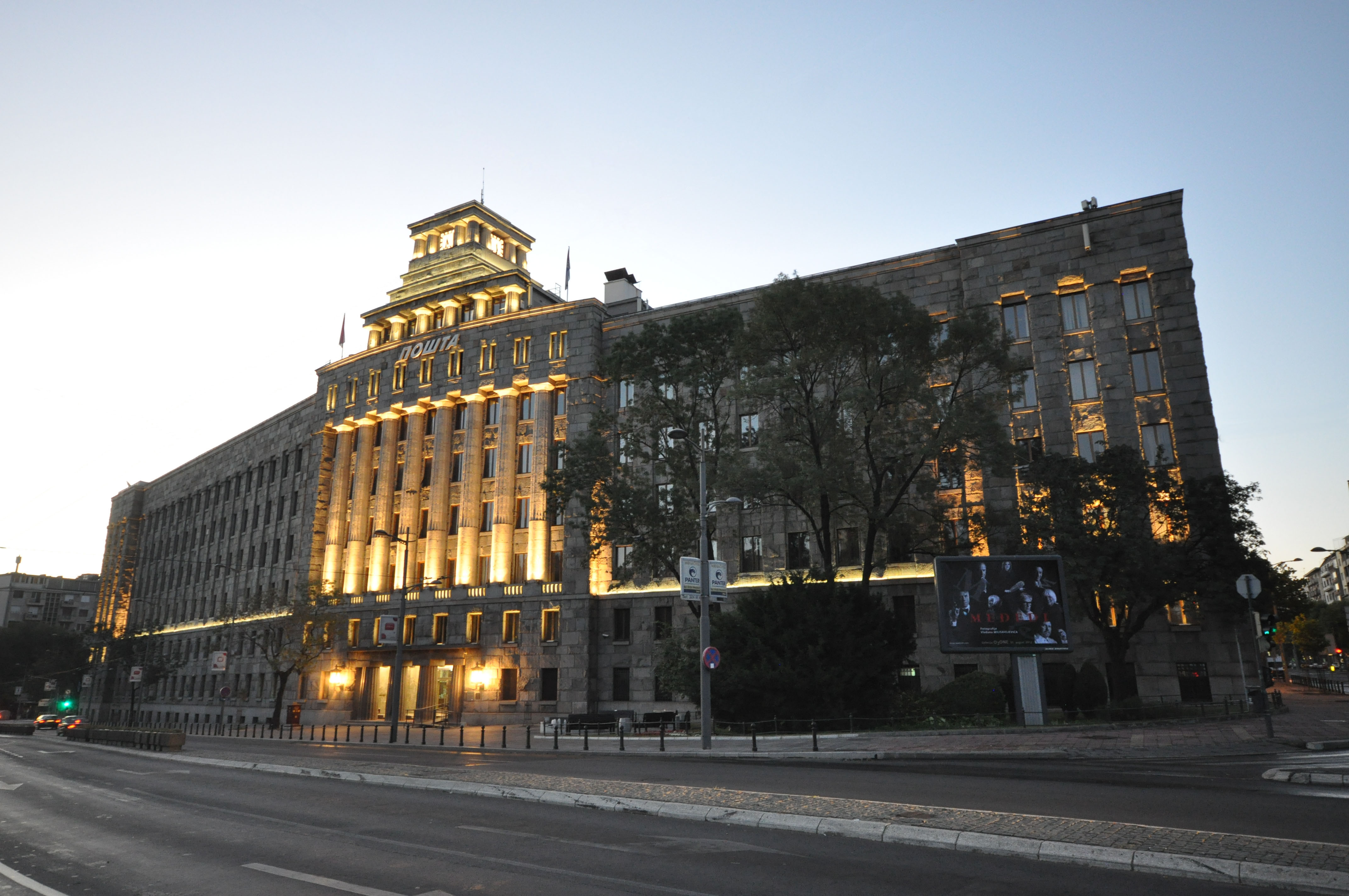
Main Post Office Palace, 1938

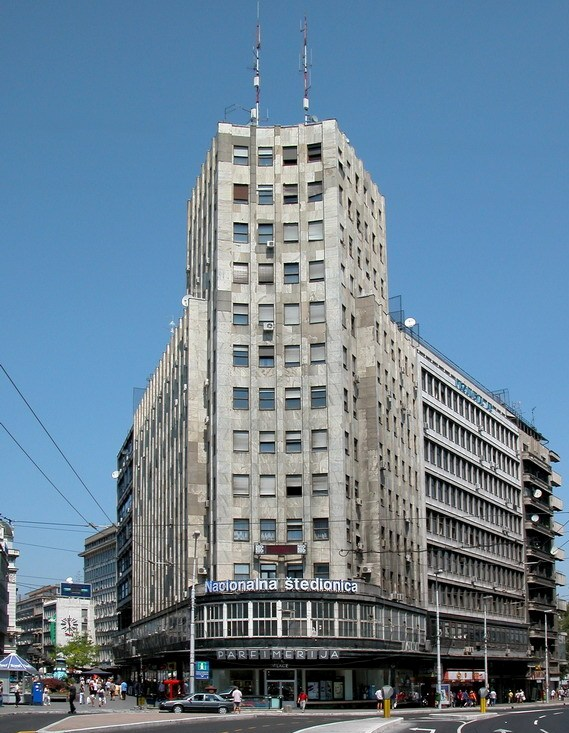
Palace Albanija, 1939
Art Nouveau and Art Deco
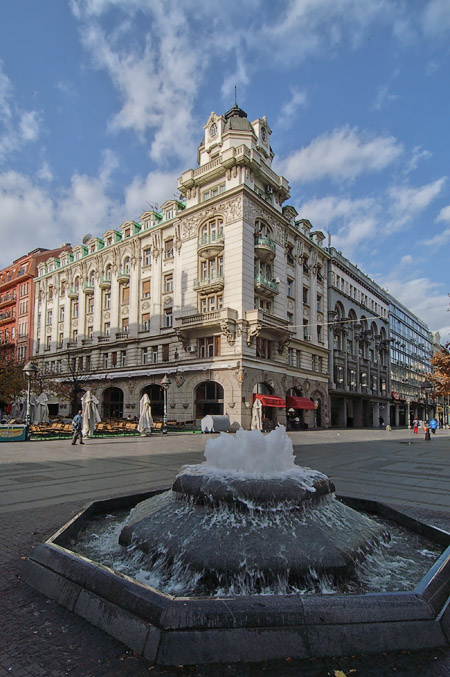
Ruski car Tavern by Petar Popović and Dragiša Brašovan, 1922-1926

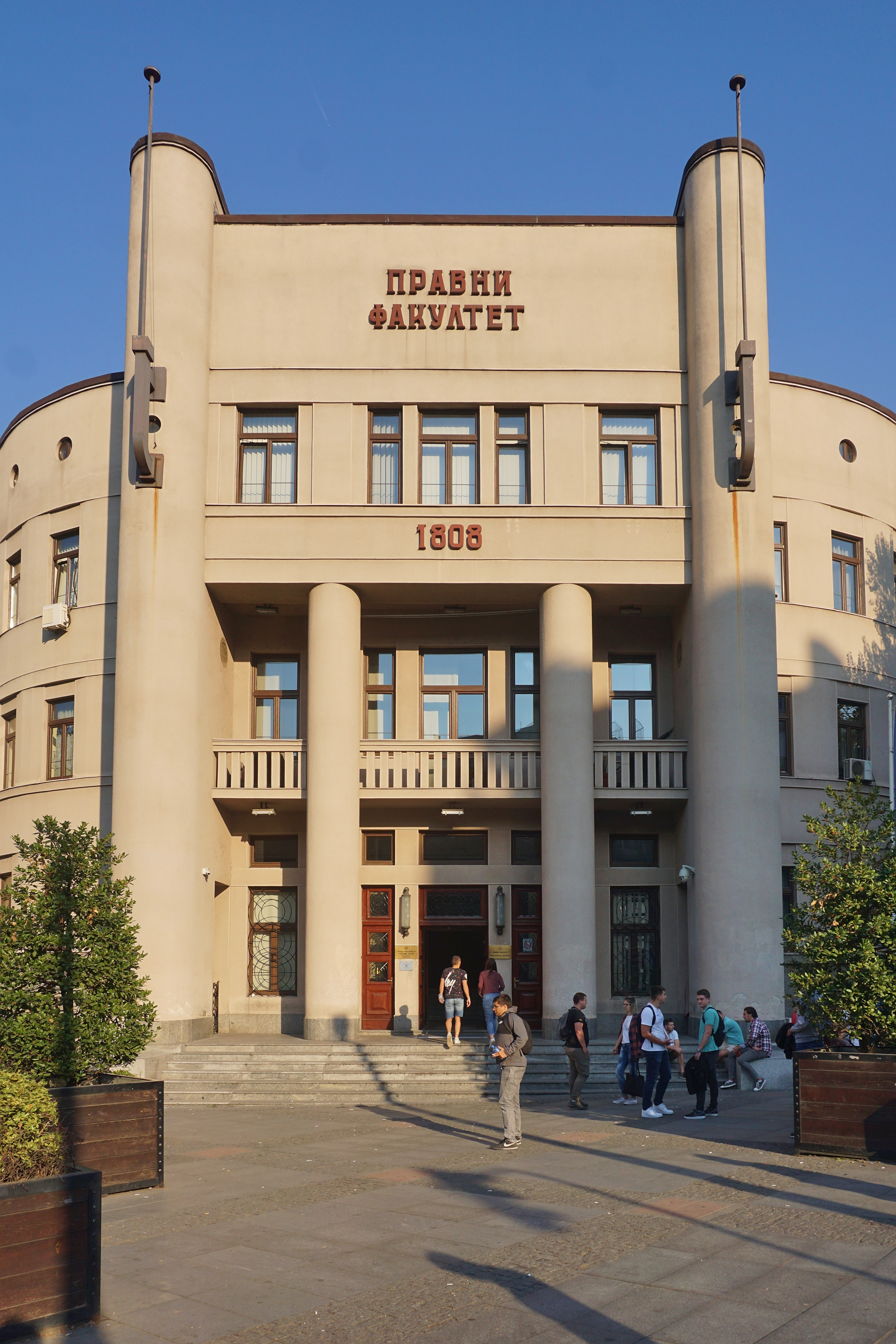
University of Belgrade Faculty of Law

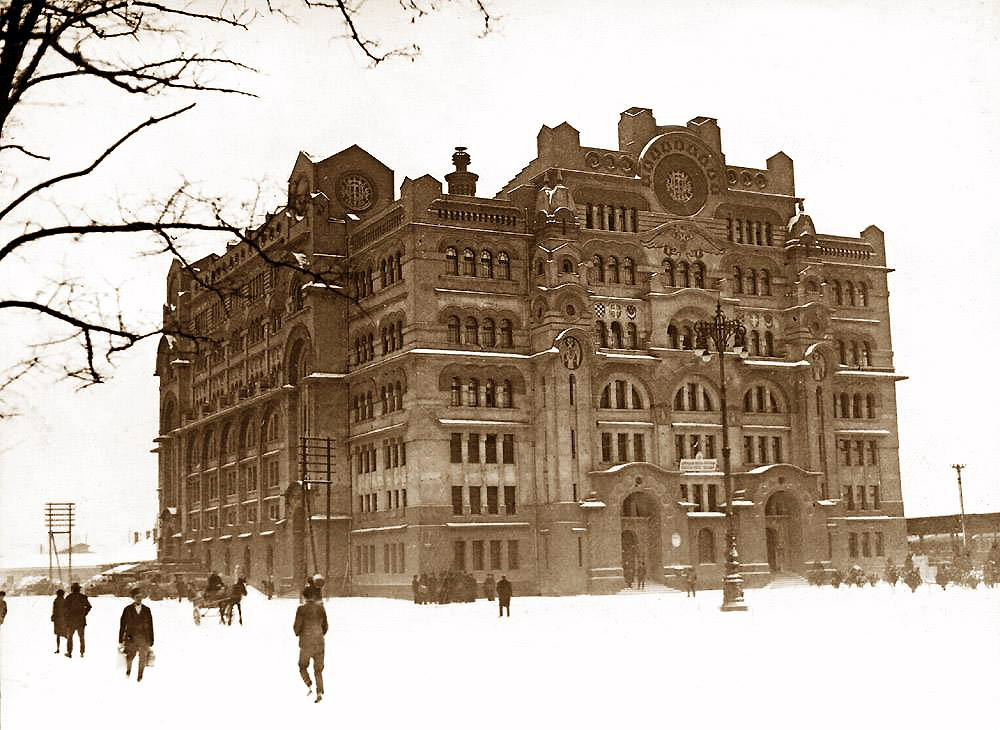
Old Post Office by Momir Korunović, 1929

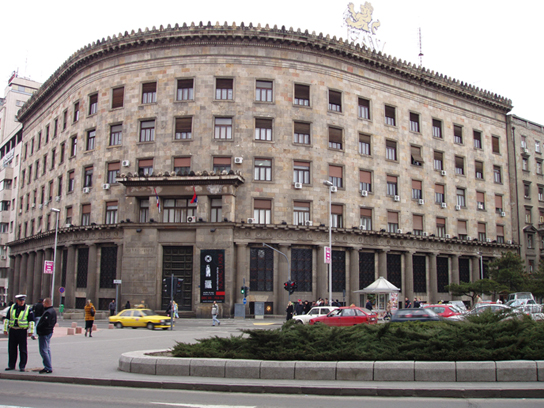
Agrarian Bank Building by Petar and Branko Krstić, 1932-1934
Interwar academic style
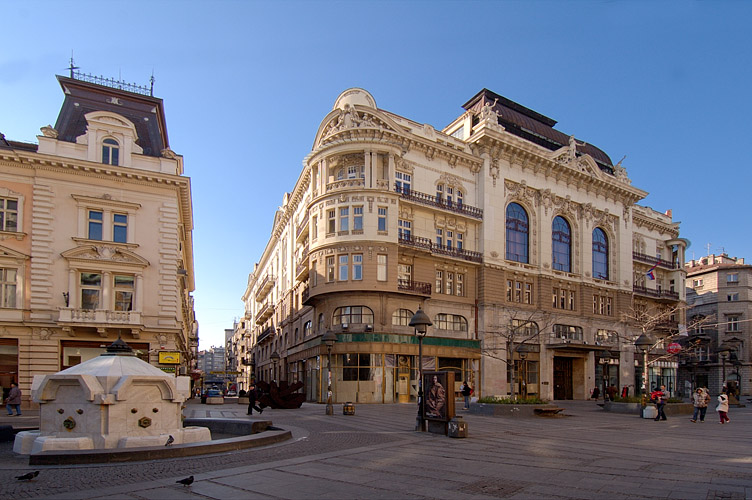
Serbian Academy of Sciences and Arts building, 1922

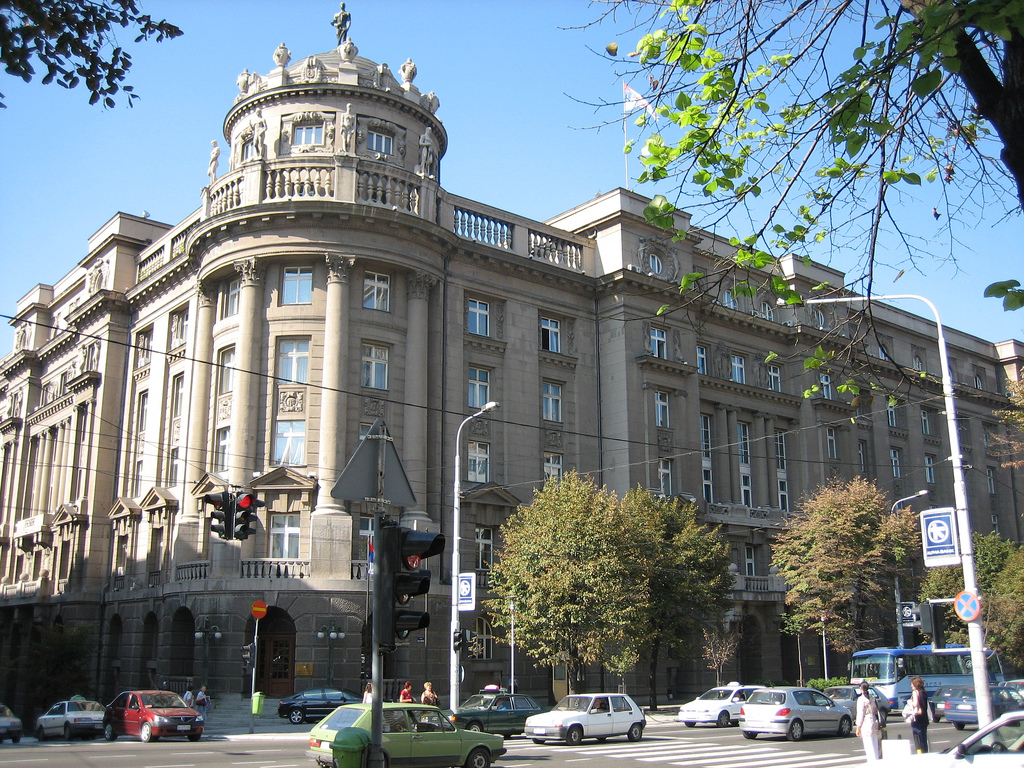
Ministry of Foreign Affairs Building, façade by Nikolay Krasnov (architect), 1923

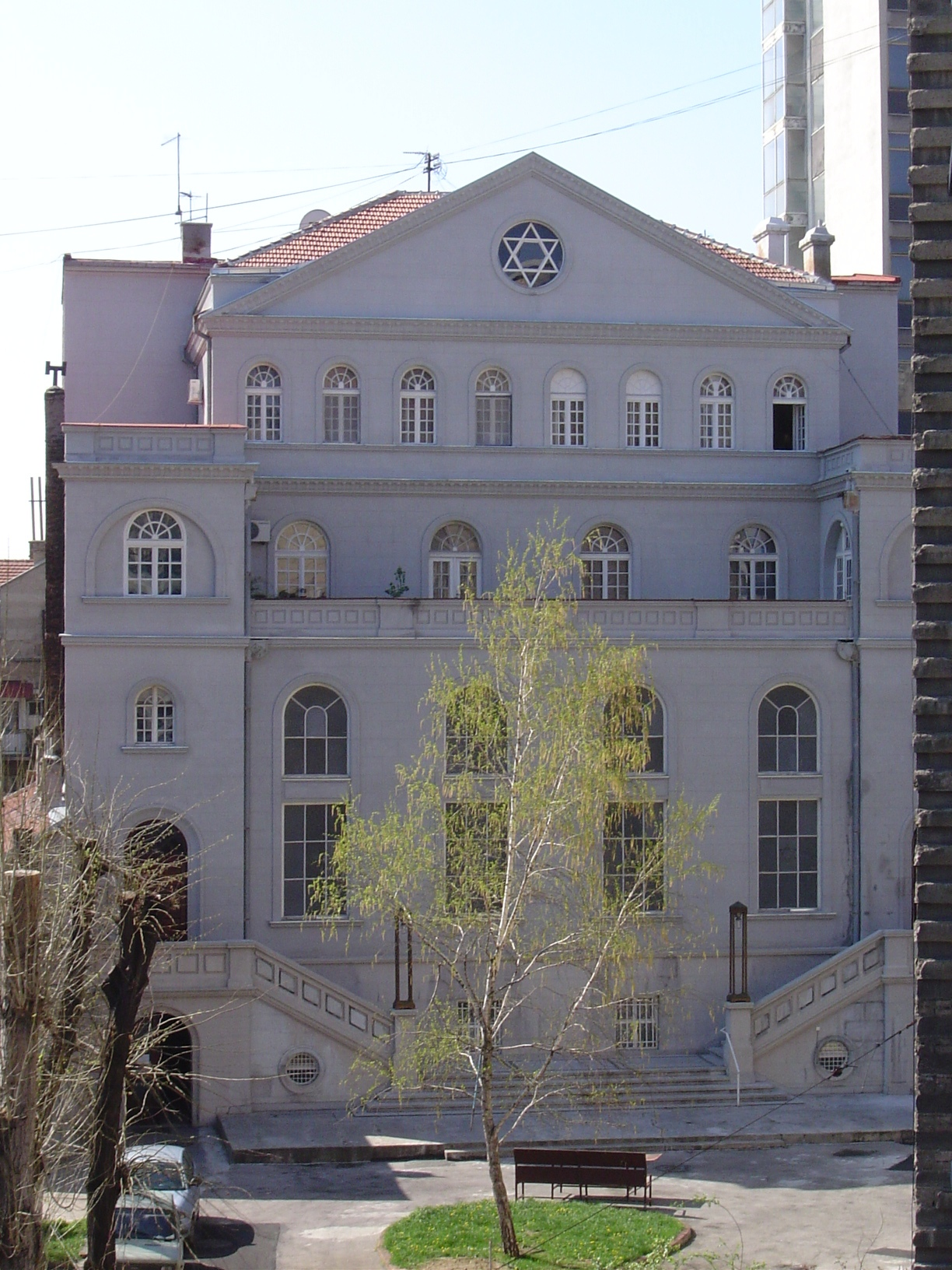
Belgrade Synagogue, 1925

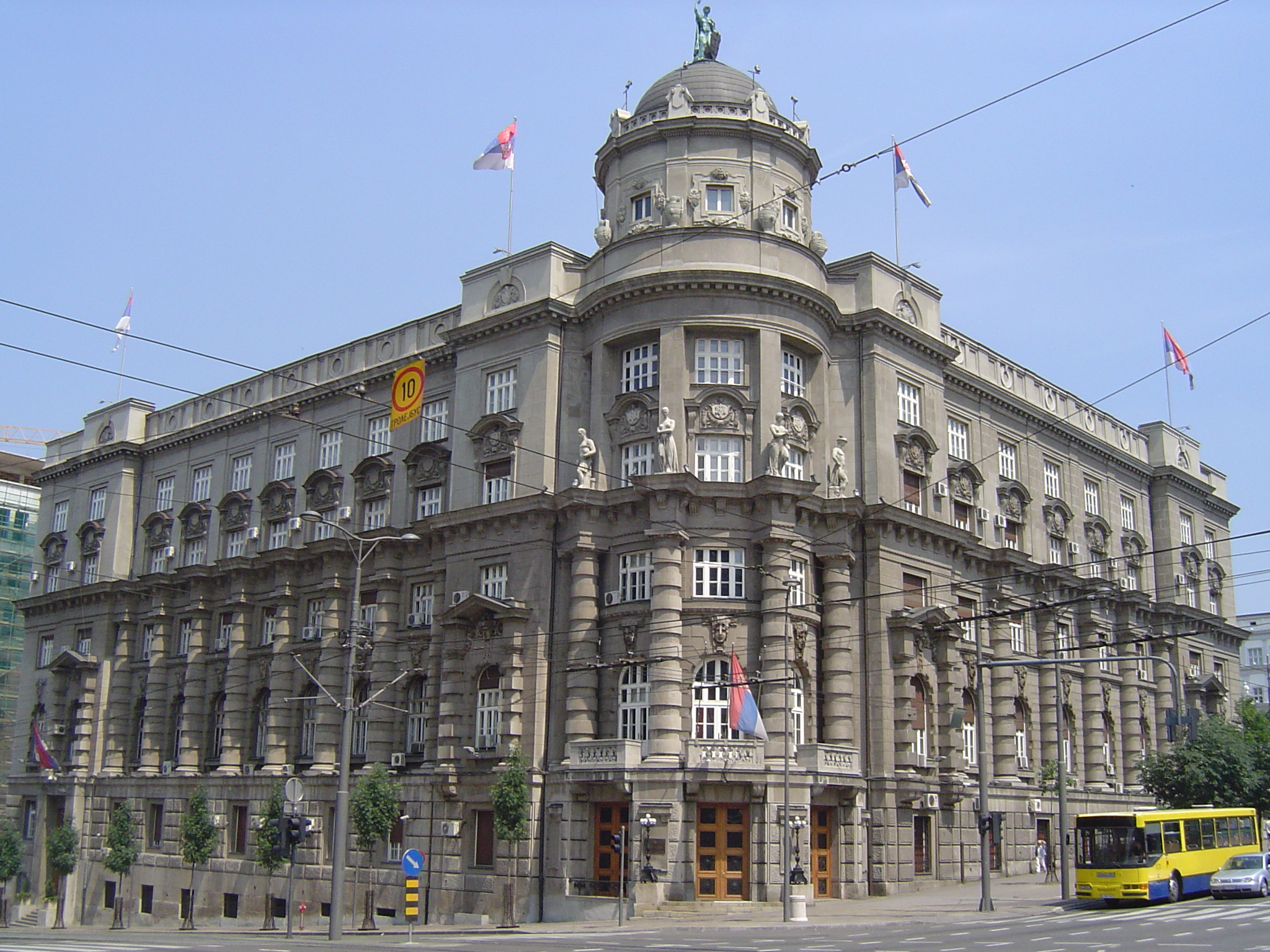
Government Building by Nikolay Krasnov (architect), 1926-1928

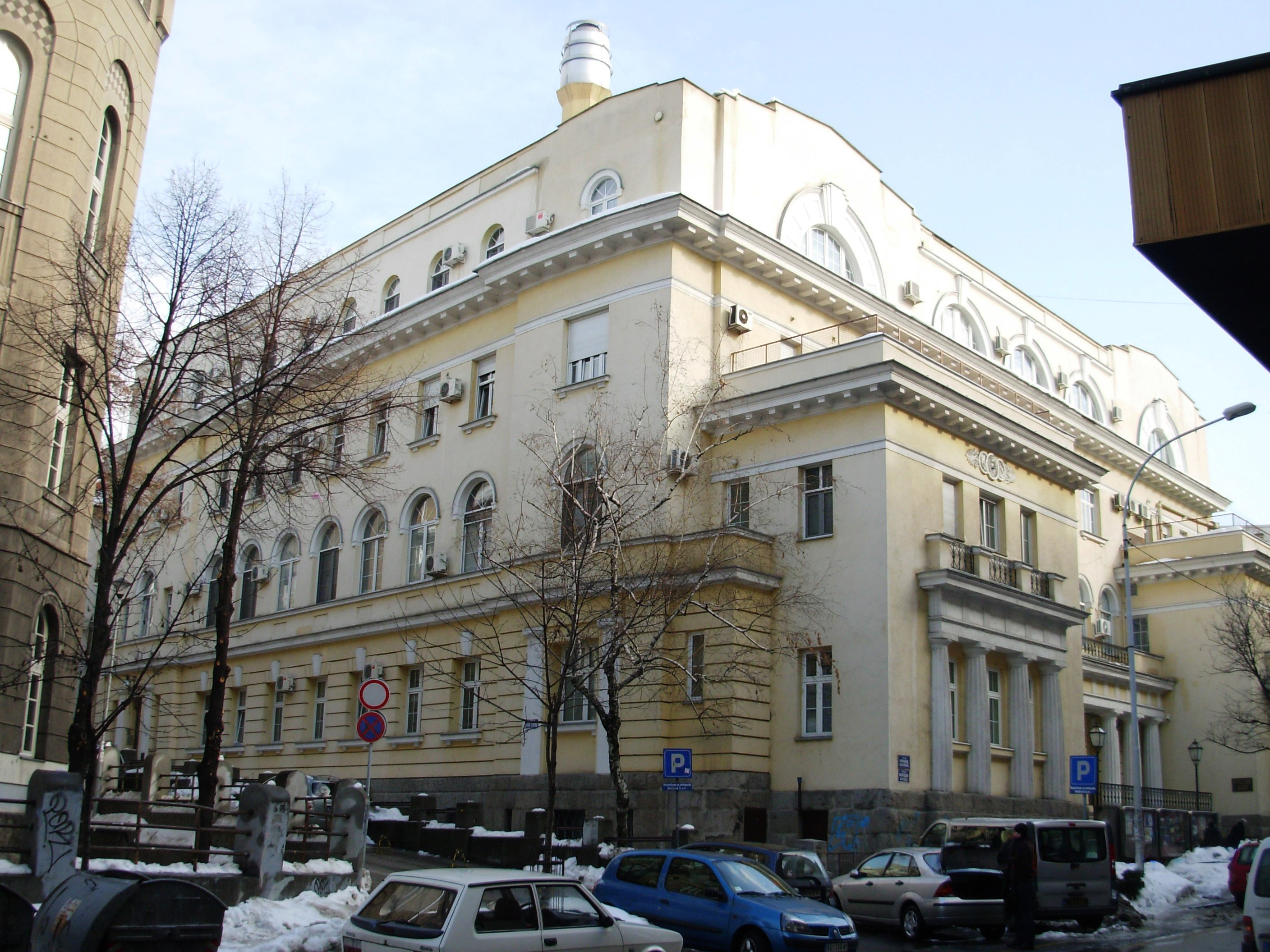
Russian House, by Vasily Baumgarten, 1931-1933

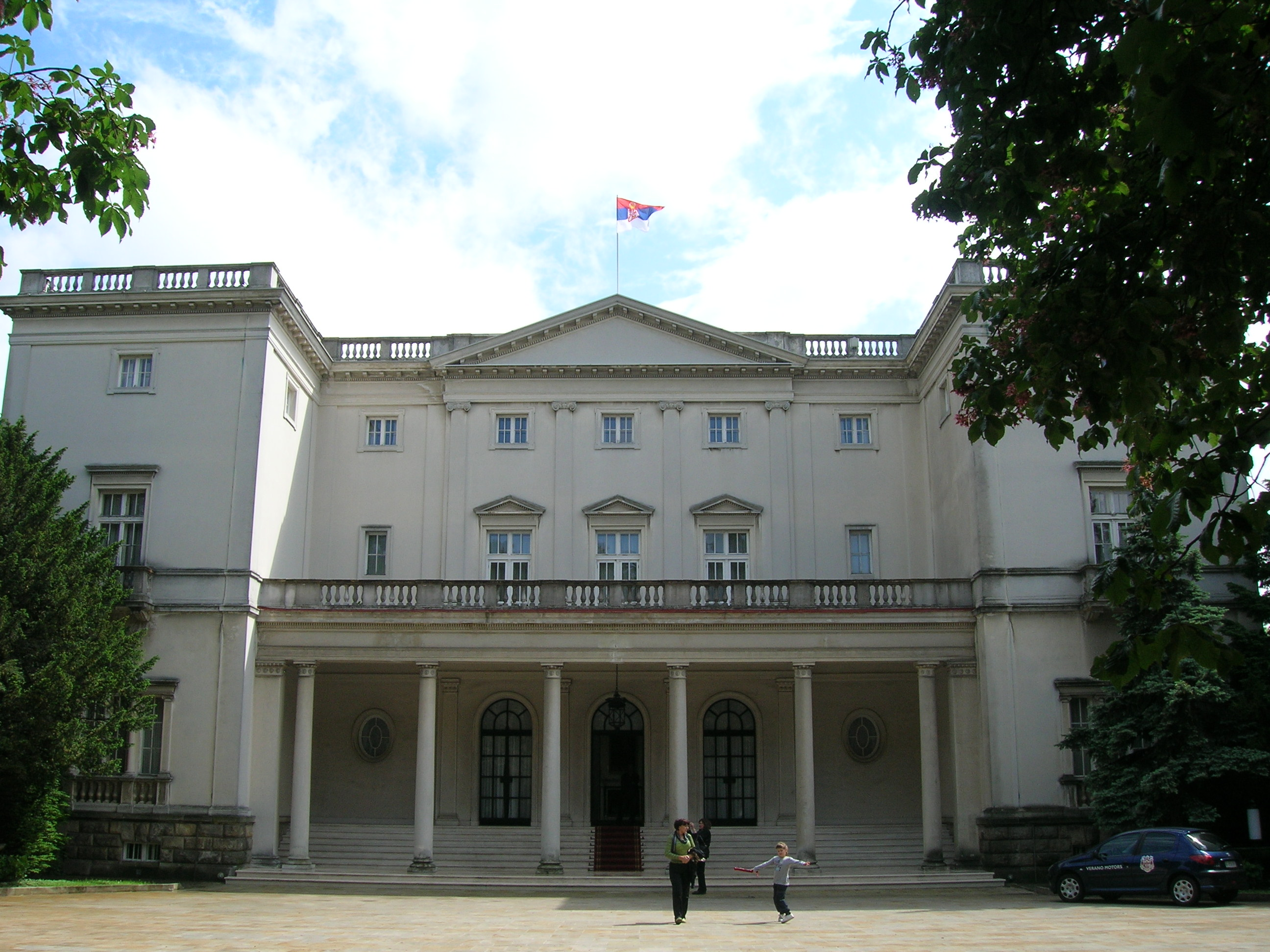
Beli Dvor, 1934

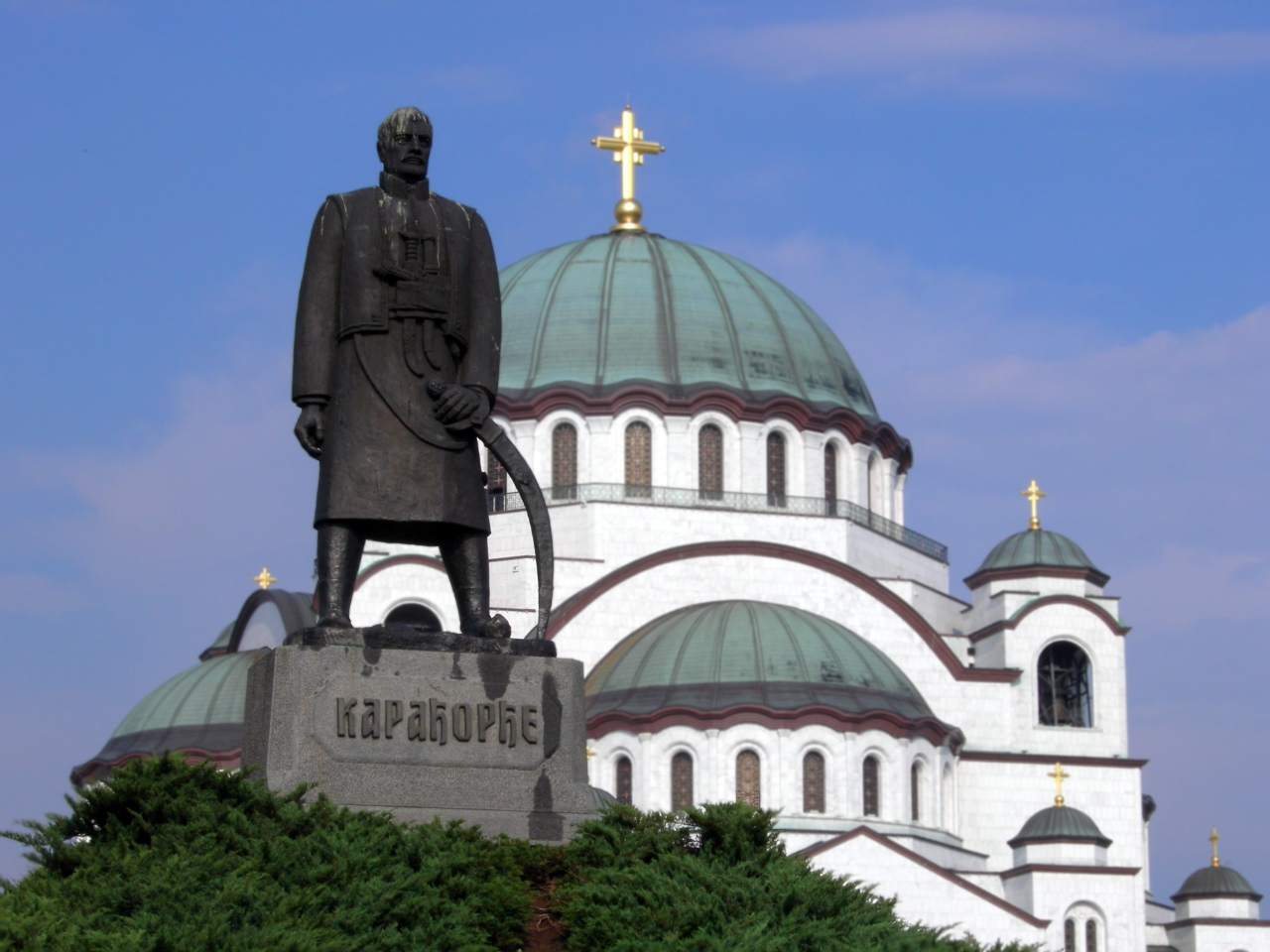
Church of Saint Sava and monument of Karađorđe (1935-present)

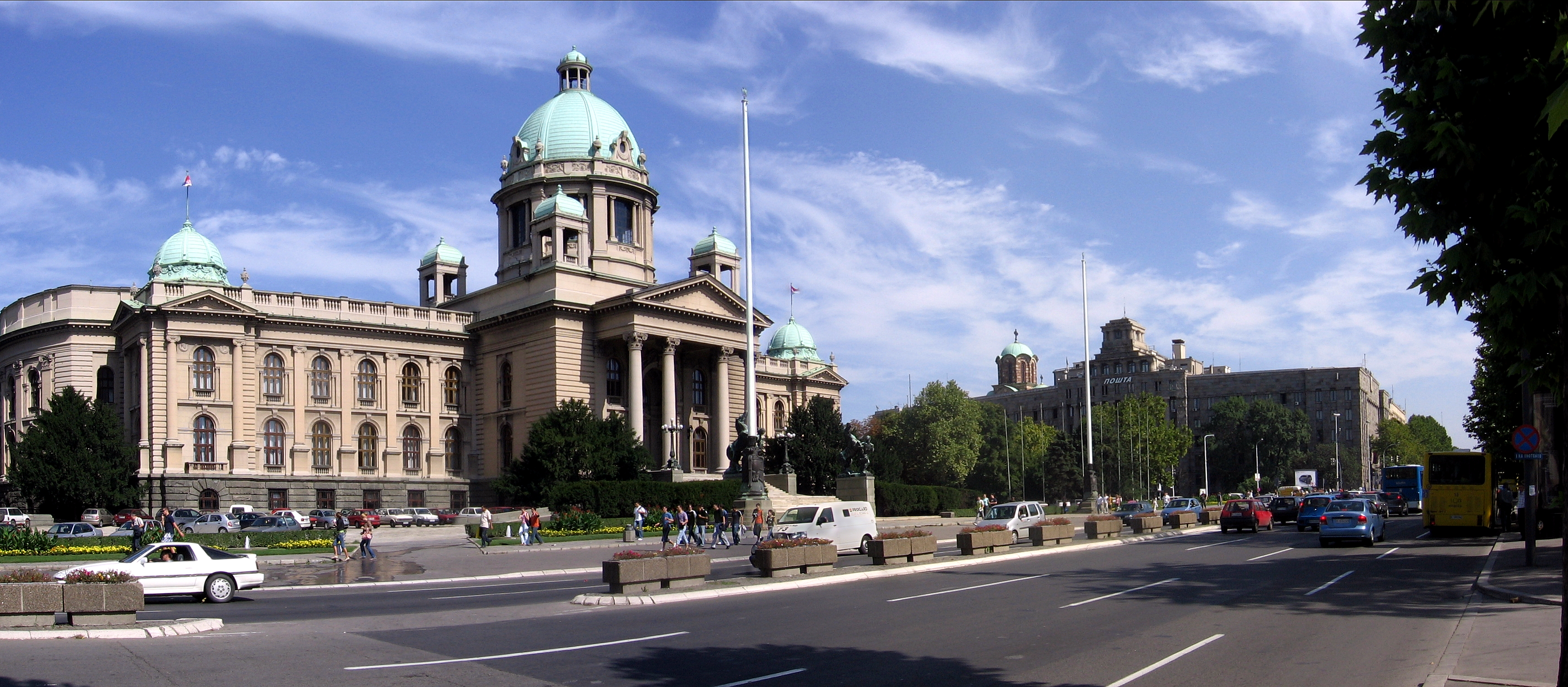
The House of the National Assembly, and the headquarters of the Serbian Post, erected in 1938

=== Socialist realism (1945-1948) ===
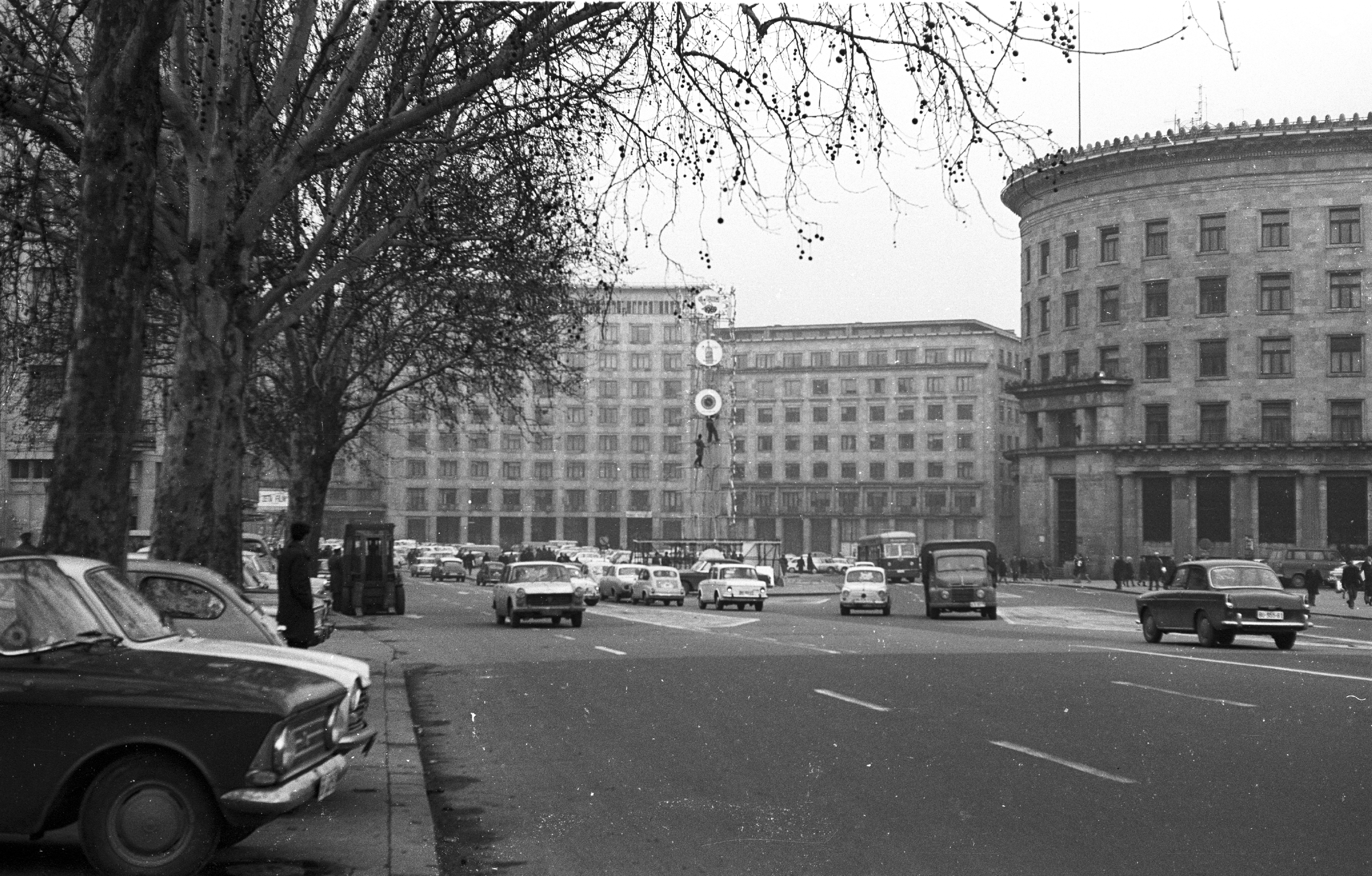
Socialist realist Dom Sindikata (1947), by Branko Petričić

Immediately following the Second World War, Yugoslavia's brief association with the Eastern Bloc ushered in a short period of socialist realism. Centralization within the communist model led to the abolishment of private architectural practices and the state control of the profession. During this period, the governing Communist Party condemned modernism as "bourgeois formalism," a move that caused friction among the nation's pre-war modernist architectural elite.

=== Socialist modernism ===
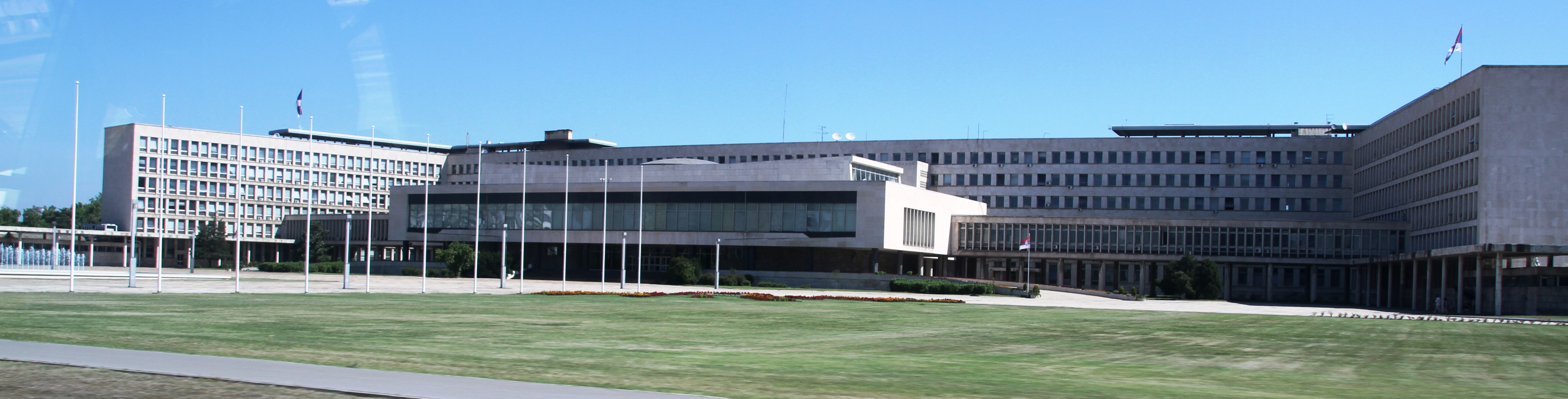
Palace of Serbia by Potocnjak and Mihailo Jankovic, 1950

Socialist realist architecture in Yugoslavia came to an abrupt end with Josip Broz Tito's 1948 split with Stalin. In the following years the nation turned increasingly to the West, returning to the modernism that had characterized pre-war Yugoslav architecture. During this era, modernist architecture came to symbolize the nation's break from the USSR (a notion that later diminished with growing acceptability of modernism in the Eastern Bloc). The nation's postwar return to modernism is perhaps best exemplified in Vjenceslav Richter's widely acclaimed 1958 Yugoslavia Pavilion at Expo 58, the open and light nature of which contrasted the much heavier architecture of the Soviet Union.

During this period, the Yugoslav break from Soviet socialist realism combined with efforts to commemorate World War II, which together led to the creation of an immense quantity of abstract sculptural war memorials, known today as spomenik

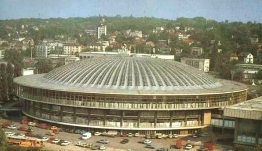
Belgrade Fair – Hall 1, Europe's largest dome and the world's largest dome between 1957 and 1965

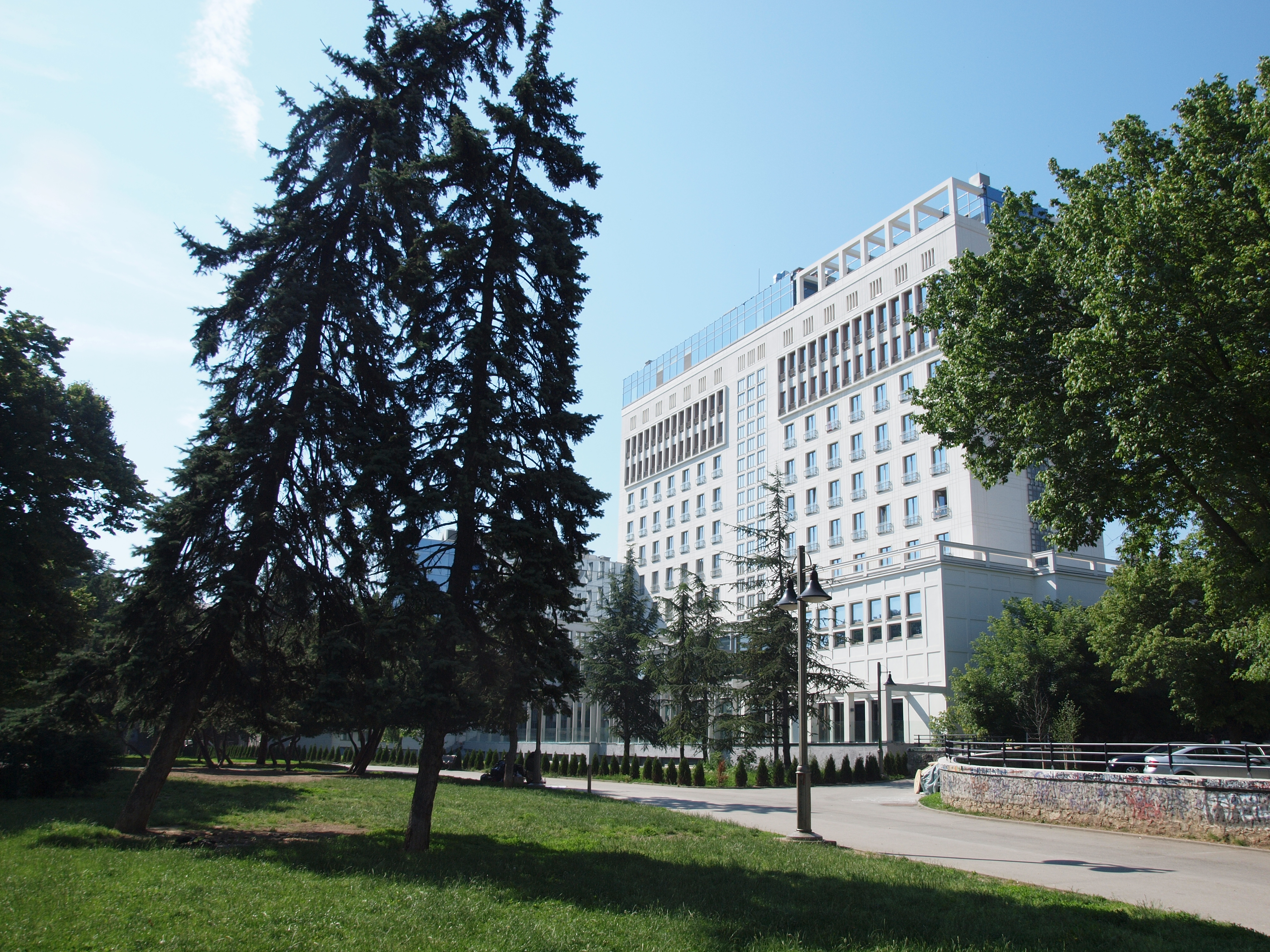
Hotel Metropol by Dragiša Brašovan, 1957

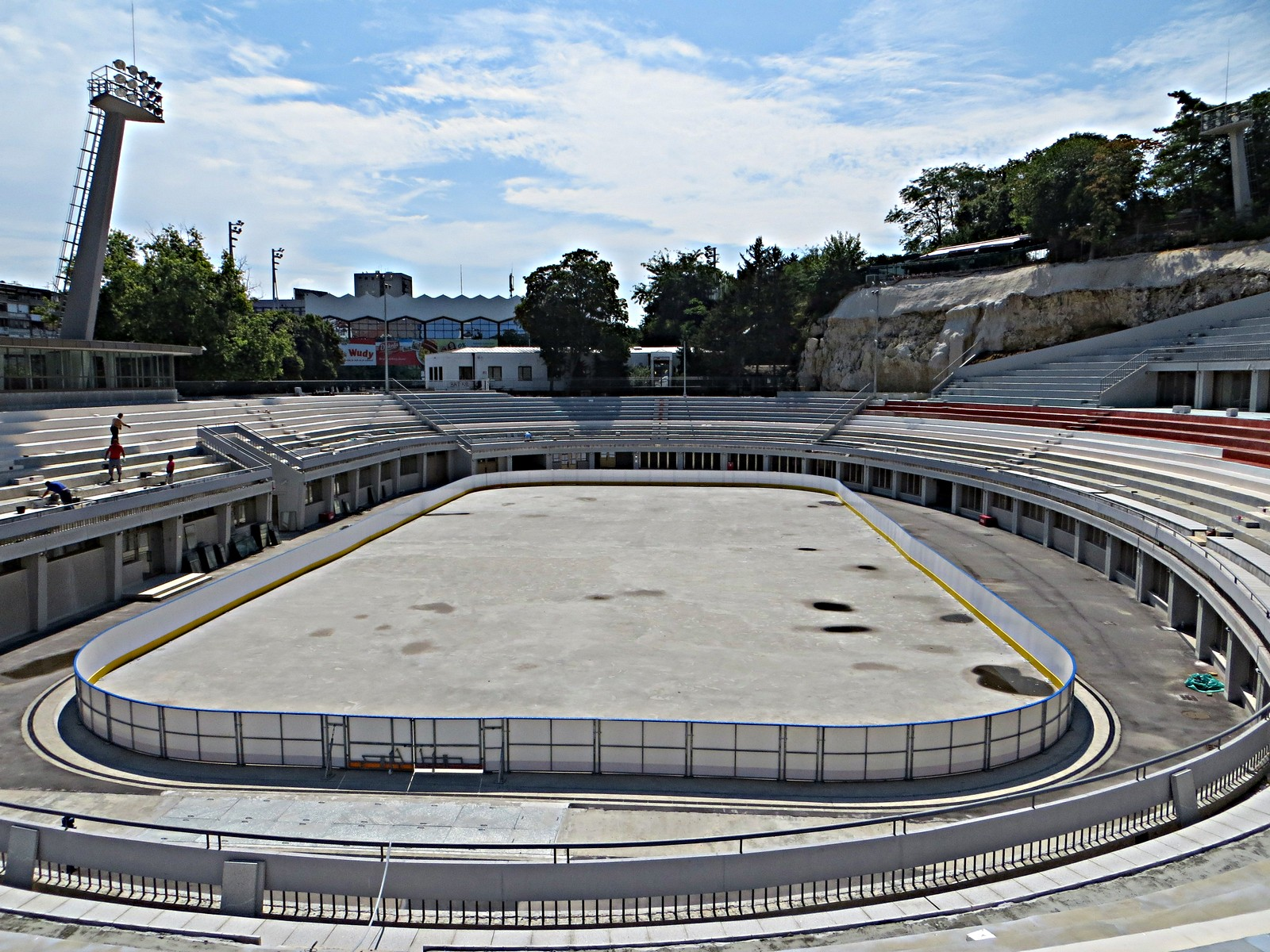
Stadion Tašmajdan, 1958

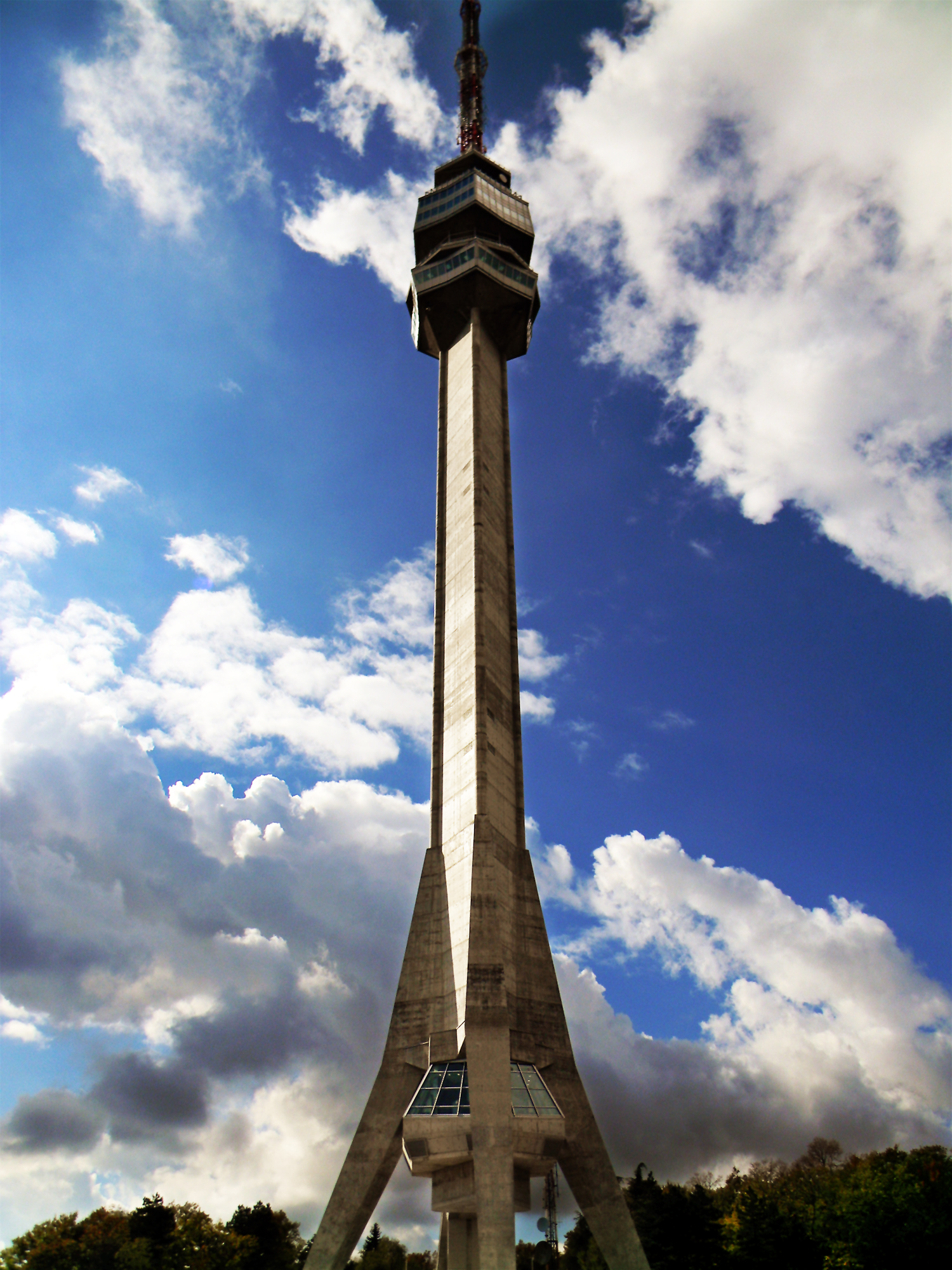
Avala Tower, 1961

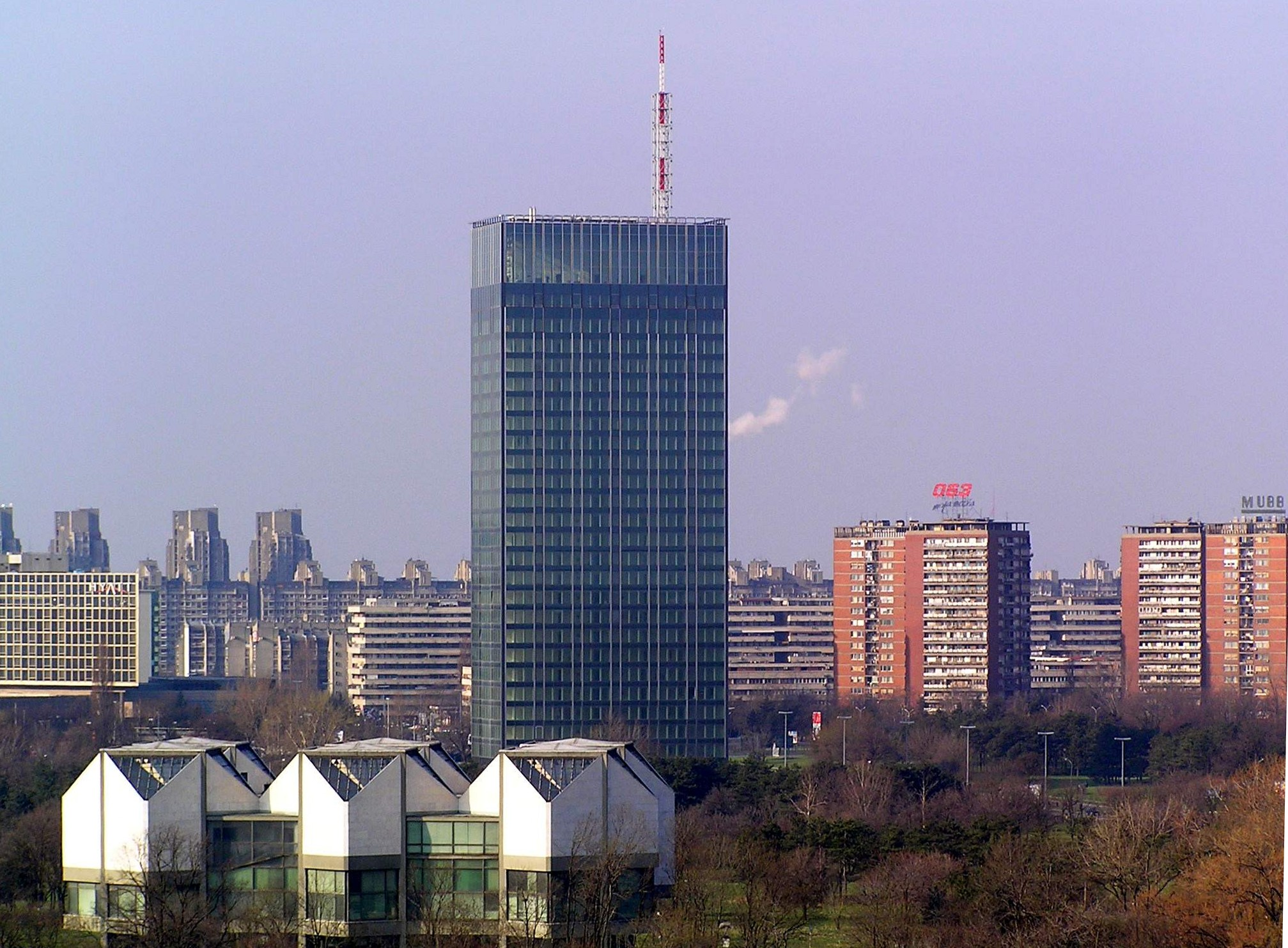
Ušće Towers, 1964

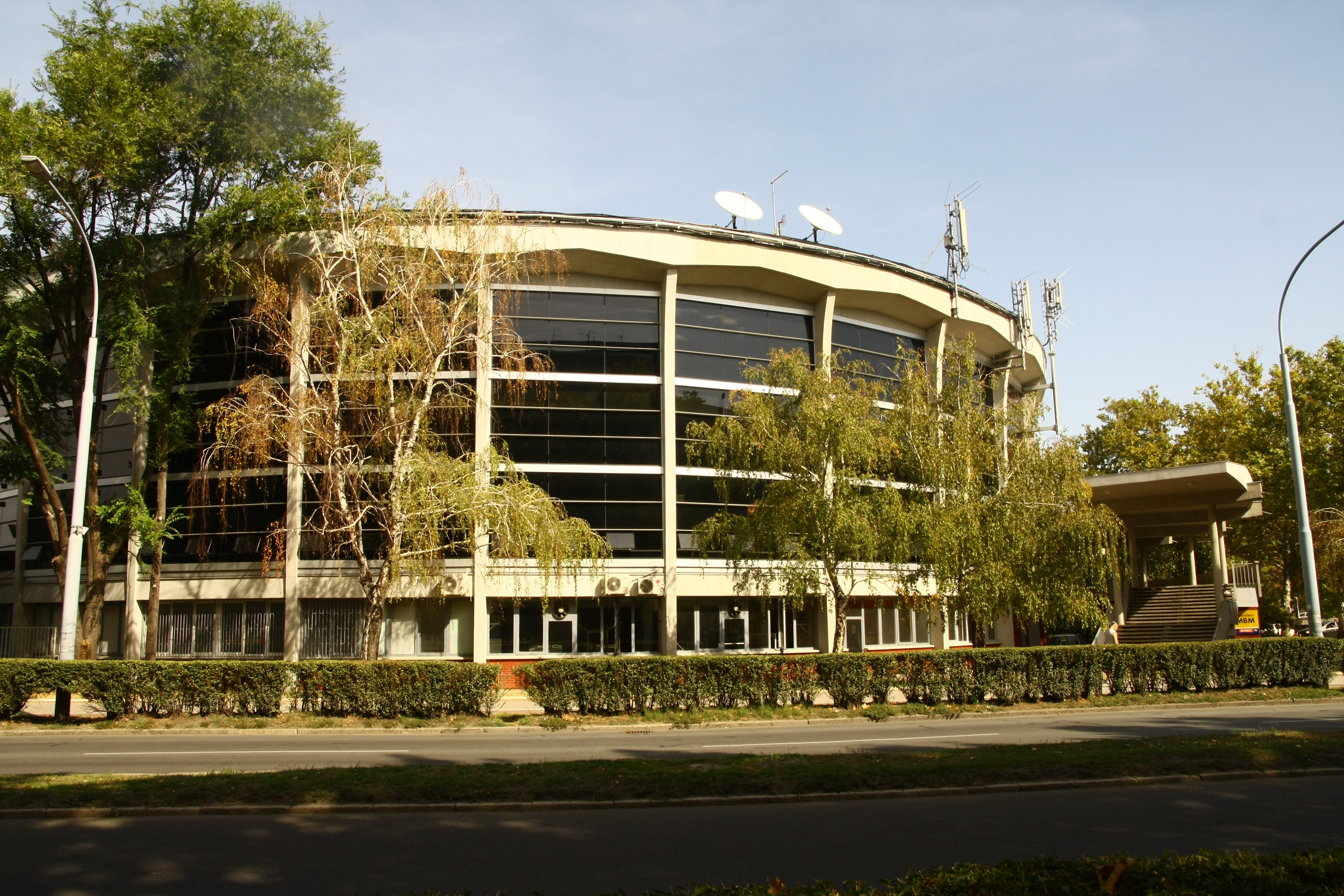
Ranko Žeravica Sports Hall (Hala), 1968

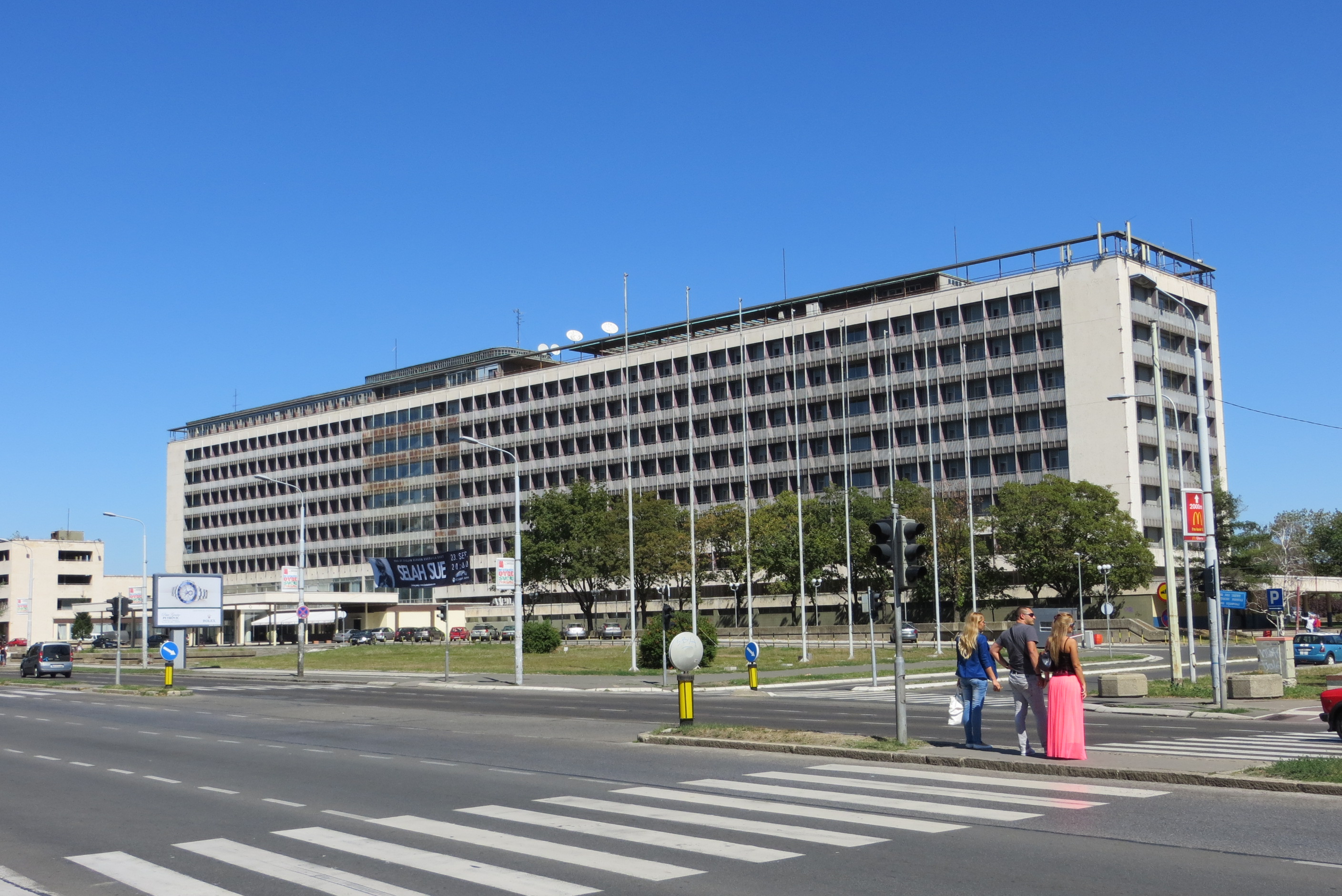
Hotel Jugoslavija by Lavoslav Horvat, 1969

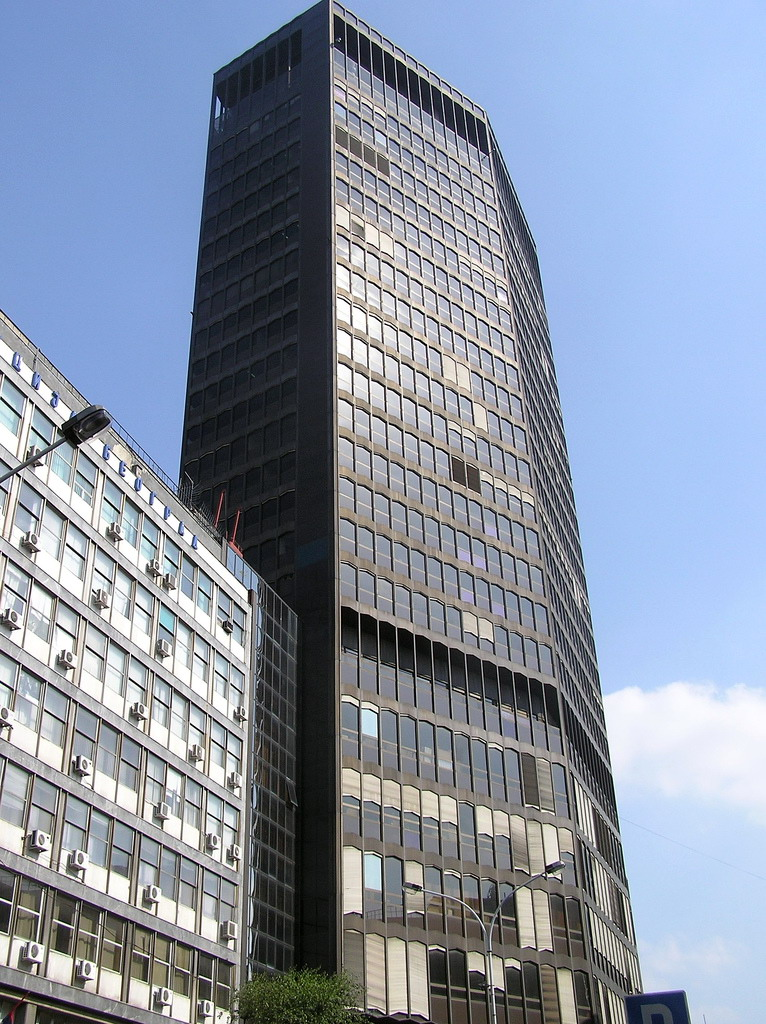
Beograđanka tower, 1974

=== Brutalism ===
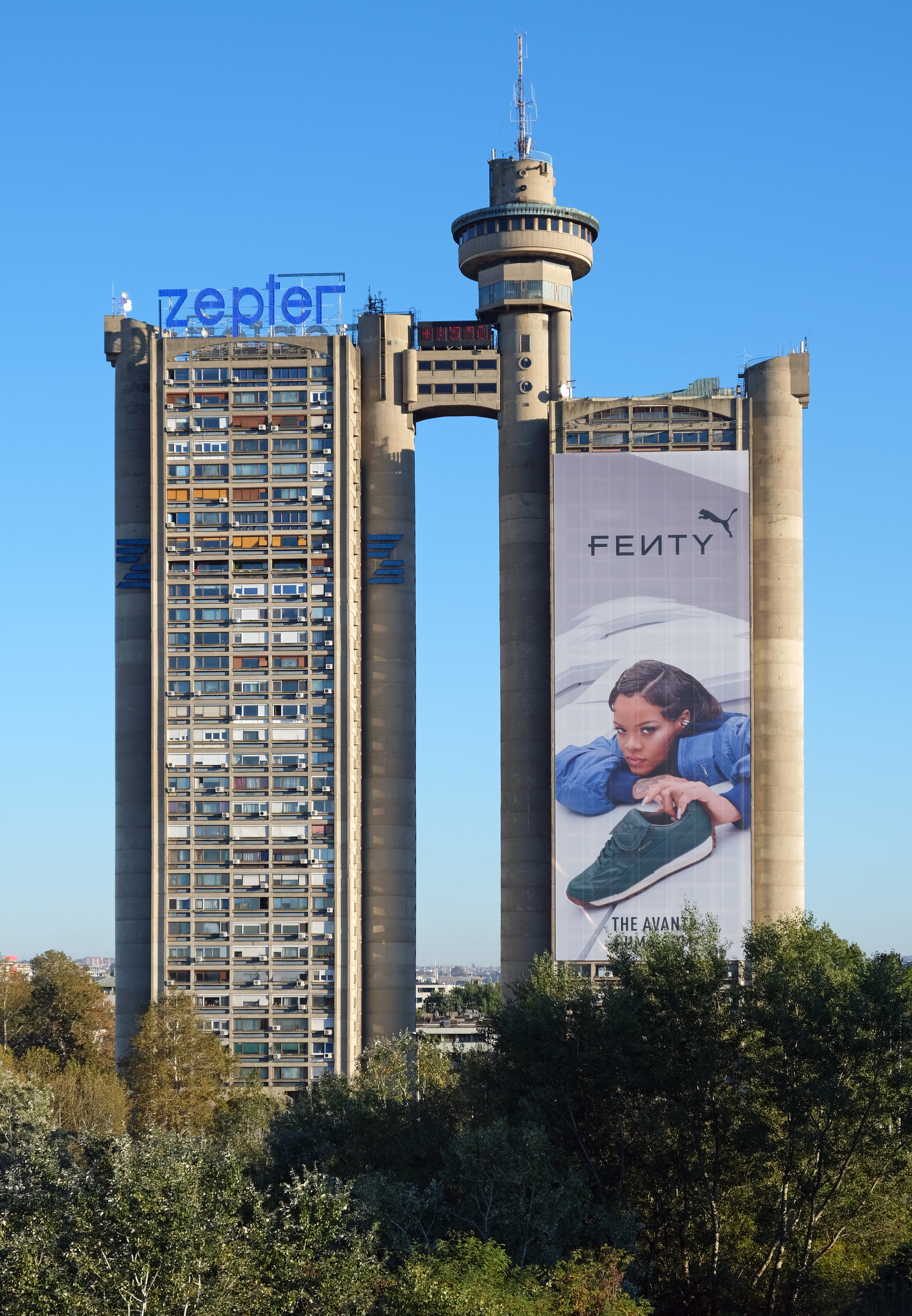
Western City Gate (1977) by Mihajlo Mitrović

In the late 1950s and early 1960s Brutalism began to garner a following within Yugoslavia, particularly among younger architects, a trend possibly influenced by the 1959 disbandment of the Congrès Internationaux d'Architecture Moderne.

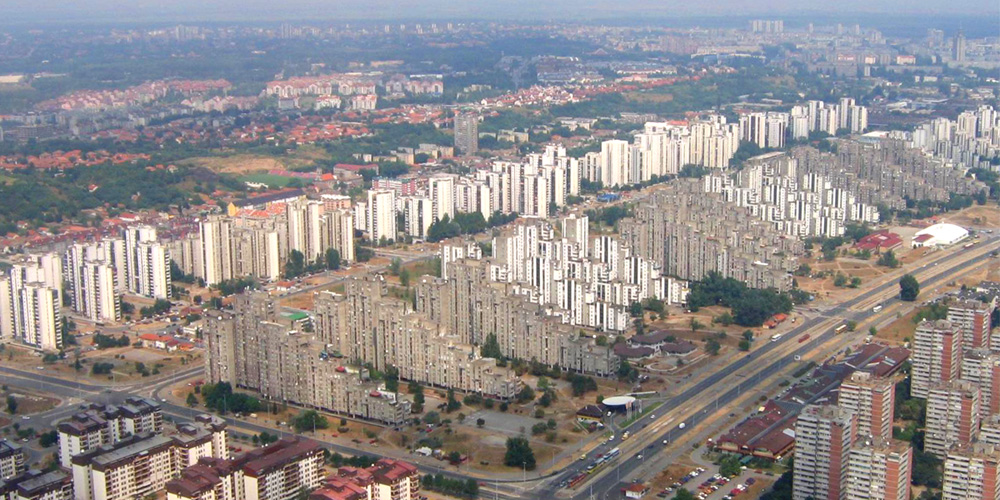
The brutalist blokovi of Novi Beograd

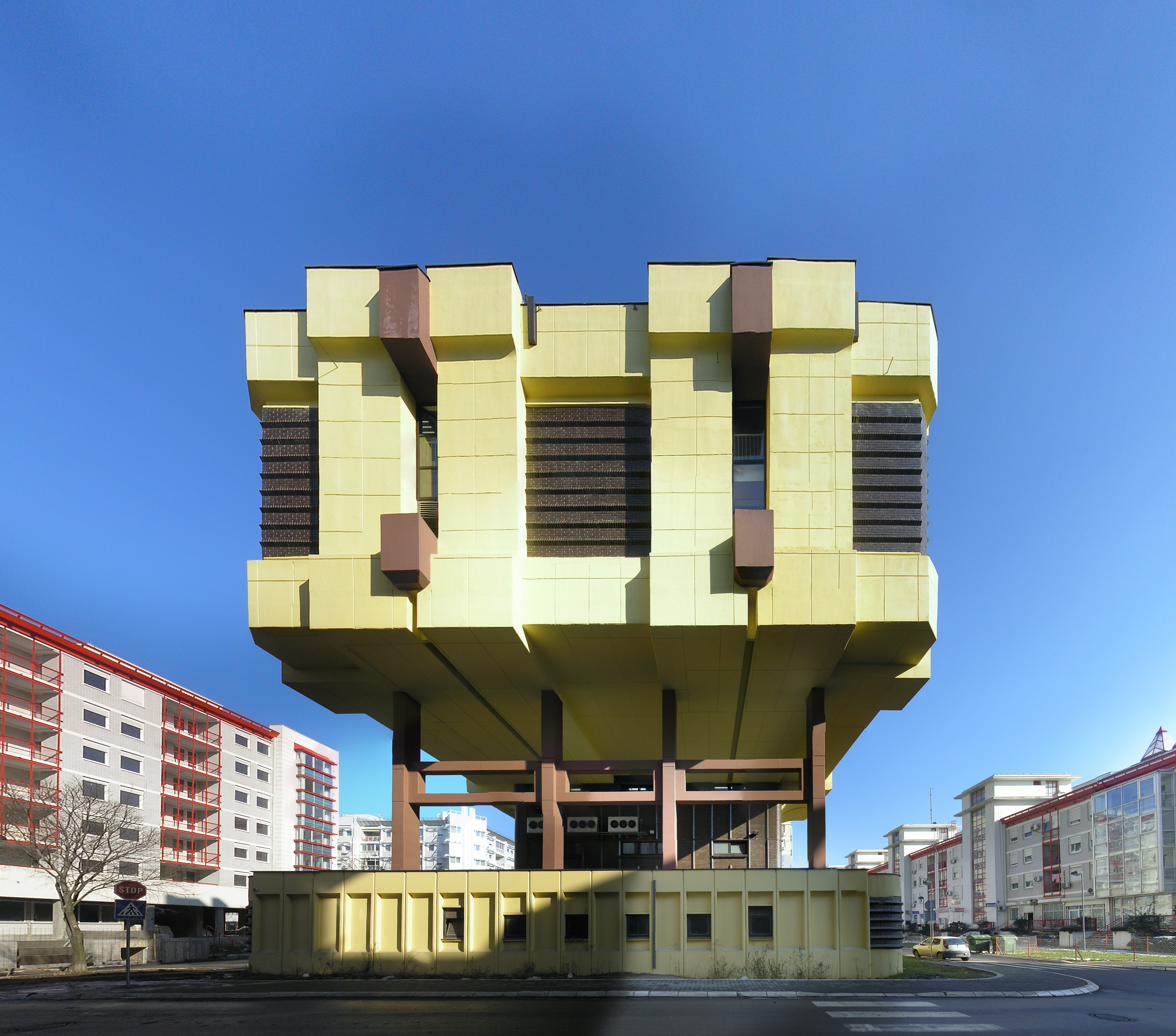
Telephone central office, Novi Beograd

=== Decentralization ===
With 1950s decentralization and liberalization policies in SFR Yugoslavia, architecture became increasingly fractured along ethnic lines. Architects increasingly focused on building with reference to the architectural heritage of their individual socialist republics in the form of critical regionalism. Growing distinction of individual ethnic architectural identities within Yugoslavia was exacerbated with the 1972 decentralization of the formerly centralized historical preservation authority, providing individual regions further opportunity to critically analyze their own cultural narratives.

International style
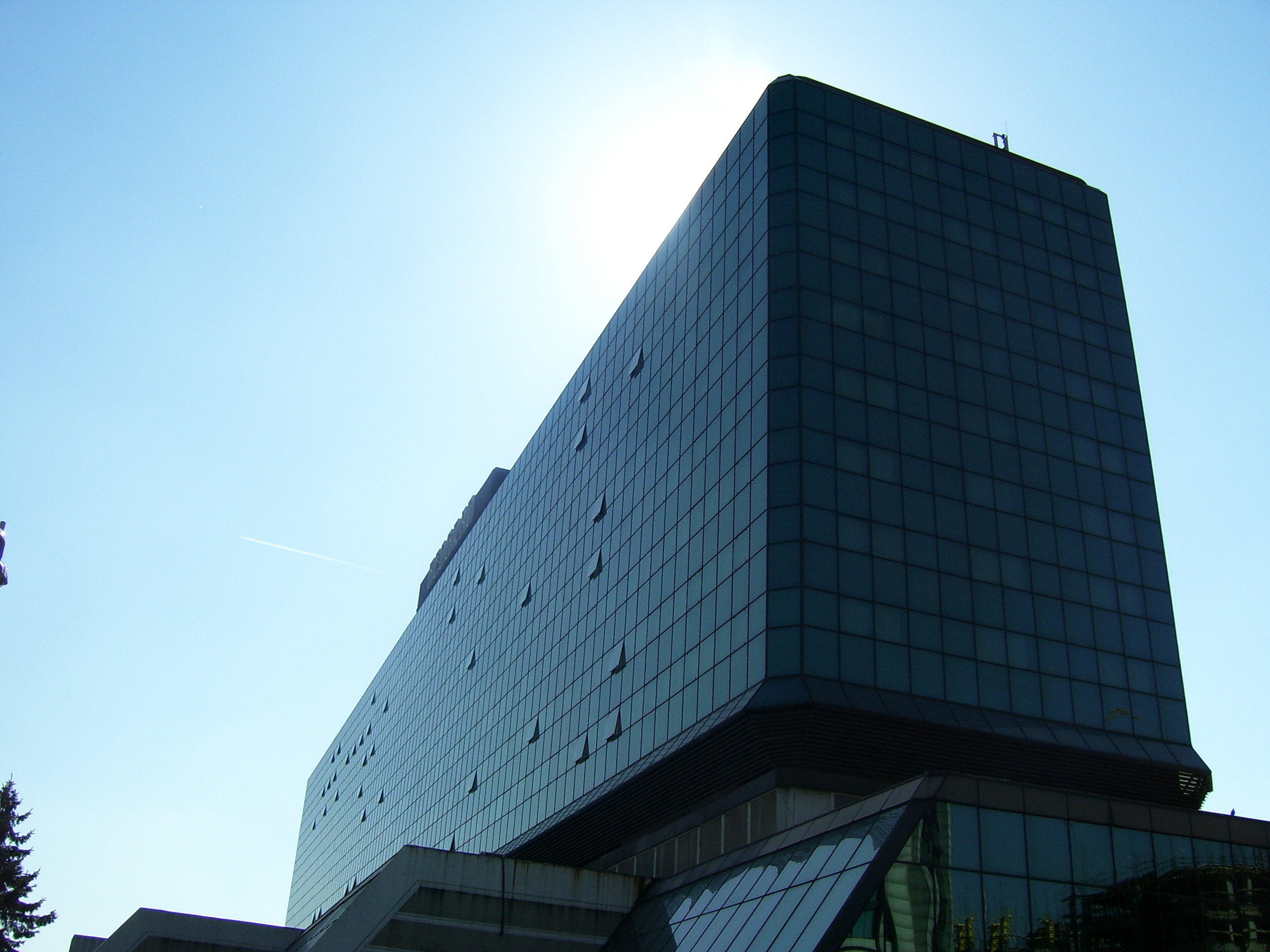
Crowne Plaza Belgrade by Stojan Maksimović, 1979

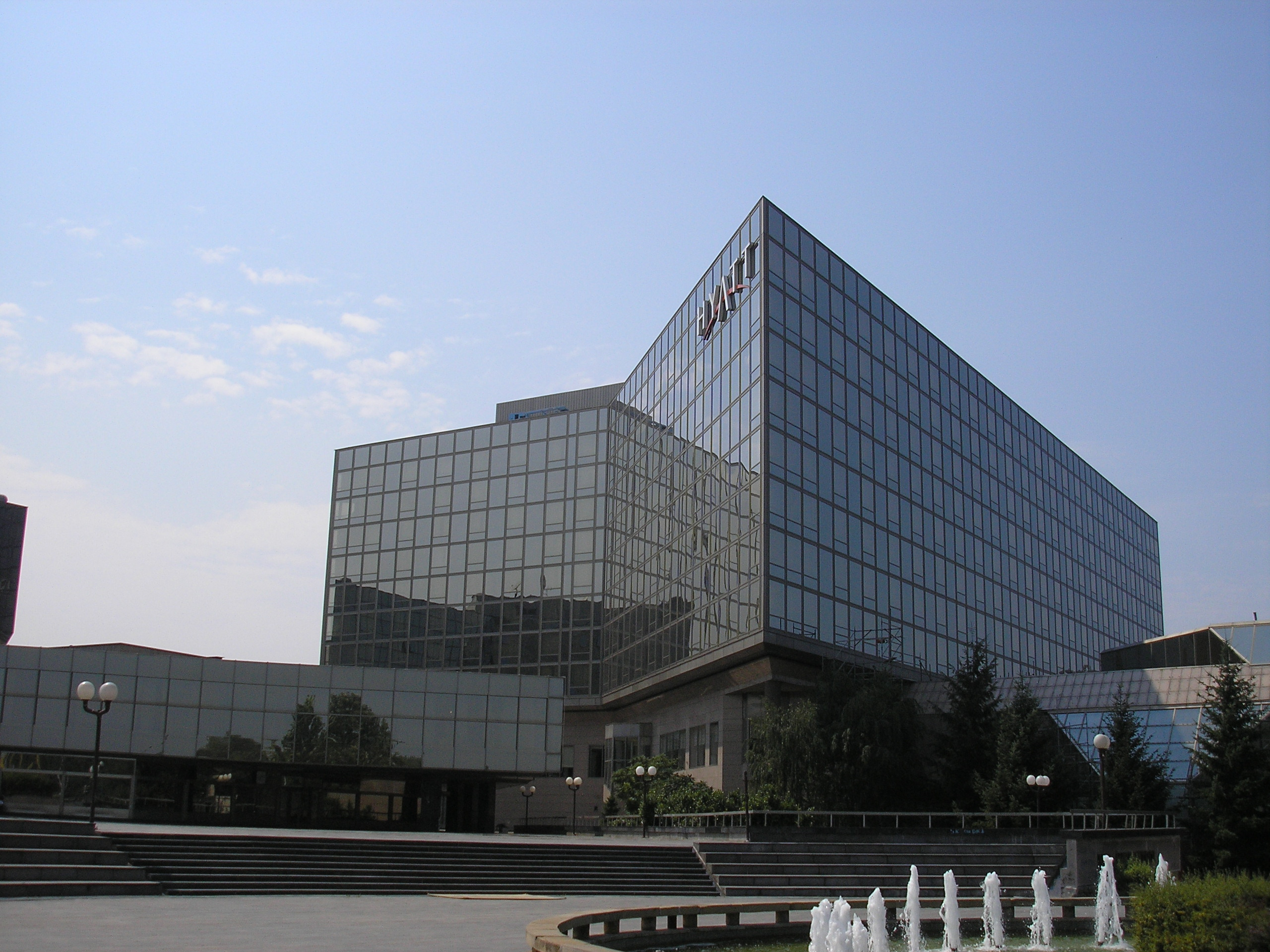
Hyatt Regency Belgrade, 1990

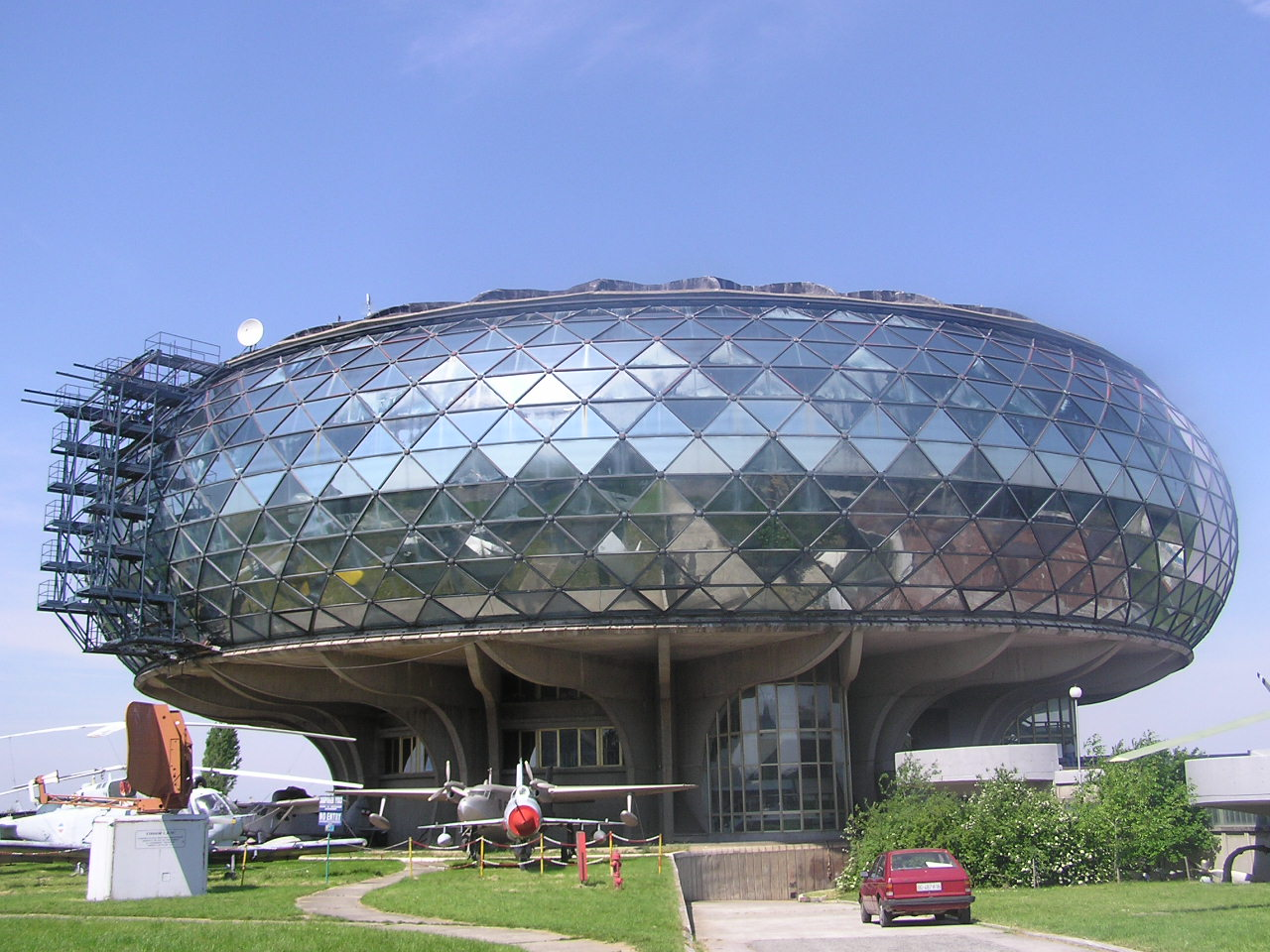
Museum of Aviation (Belgrade), by Ivan Štraus 1989

== Contemporary period ==
The international style, which had arrived in Yugoslavia already in the 1980s, took over the scene in Belgrade after the wars and isolation of the 1990s. Big real estate projects, including Sava City and the redevelopment of the Ušće Towers, led the ground, with little respect for the local architecturale heritage.

In 2015, an agreement was reached with Eagle Hills (a UAE company) on the Belgrade Waterfront (Beograd na vodi) deal, for the construction of a new part of the city on currently undeveloped wasteland by the riverside. This project, officially started in 2015 and is one of the largest urban development projects in Europe, will cost at least 3.5 billion euros. According to Srdjan Garcevic, "Vaguely contemporary but somehow cheap-looking, it is planted illegally in the middle of the city on unstable soil – serving the interests of the anonymous lucky few."

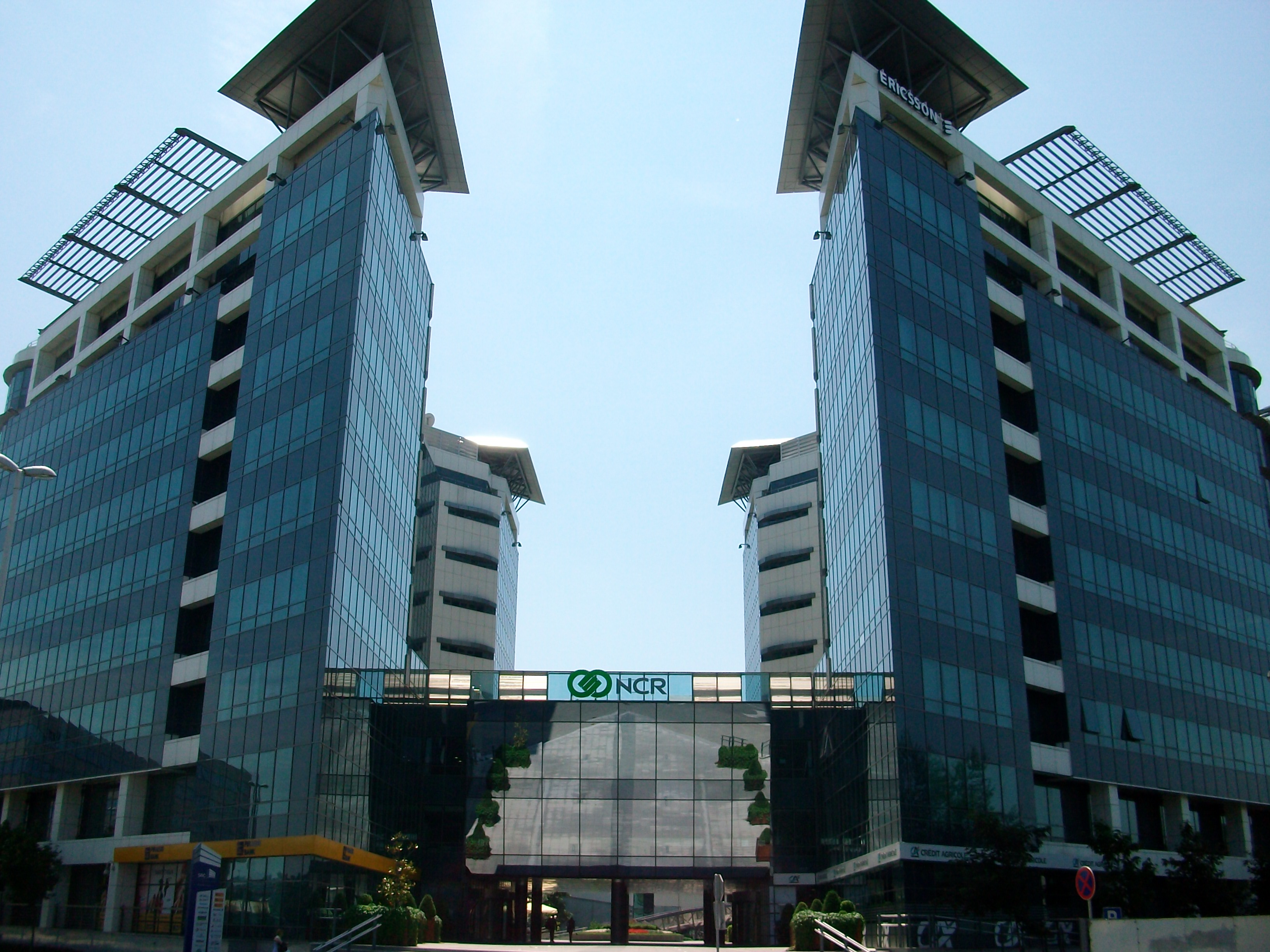
Sava City (Savograd), by Mario Jobst and Miodrag Trpković (2004-2010)

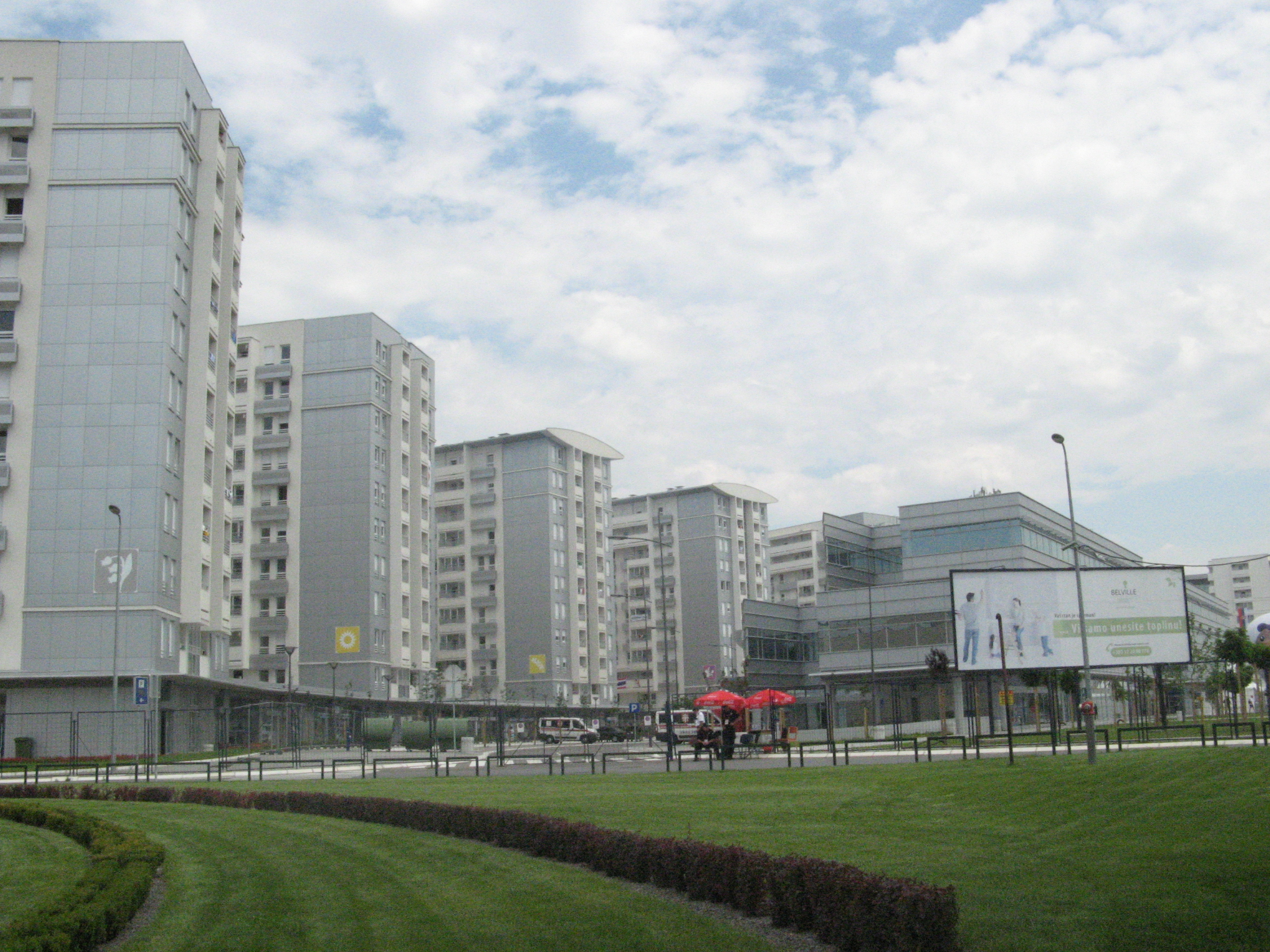
Belville, Belgrade (Block 67)

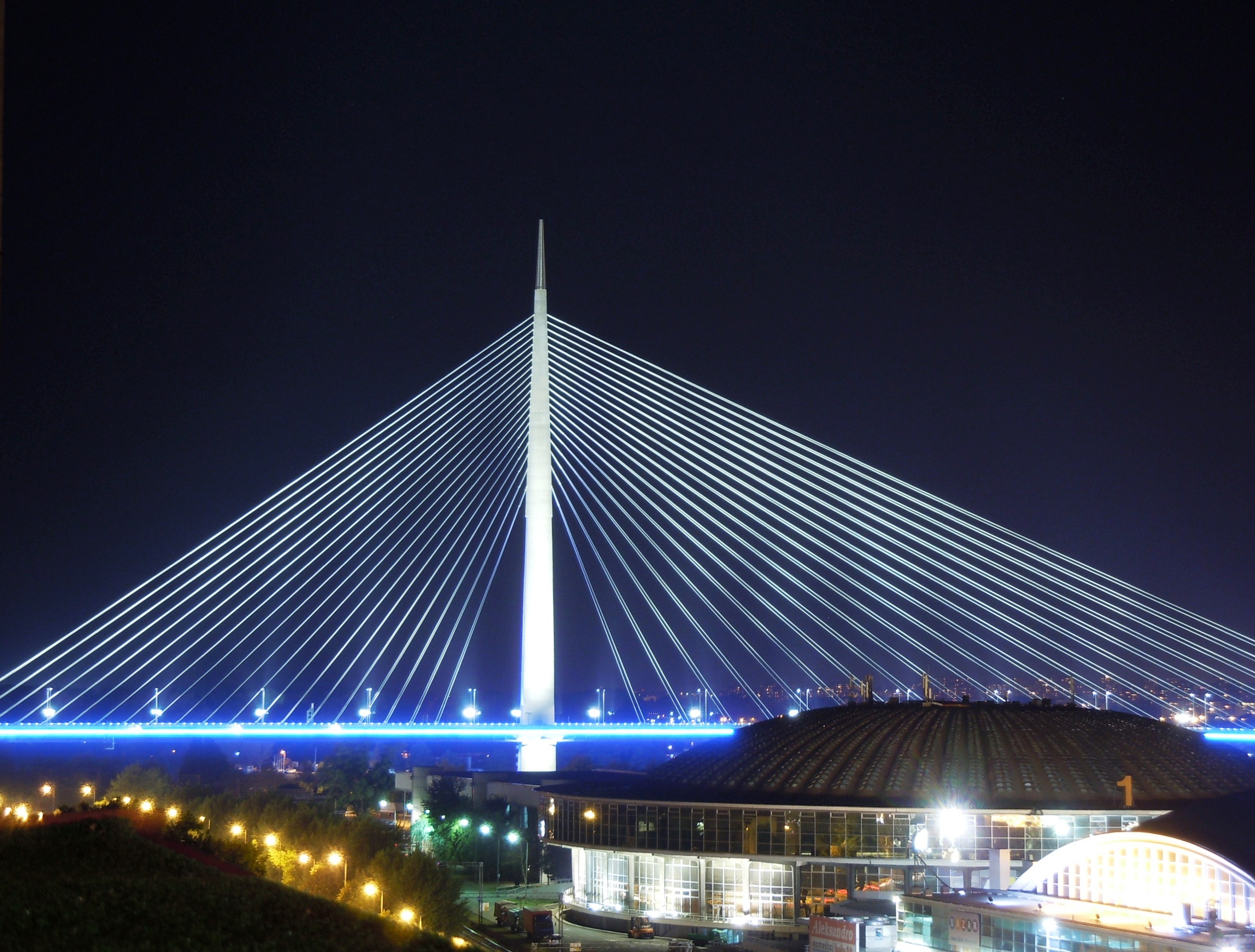
Ada Bridge (2008-2011)

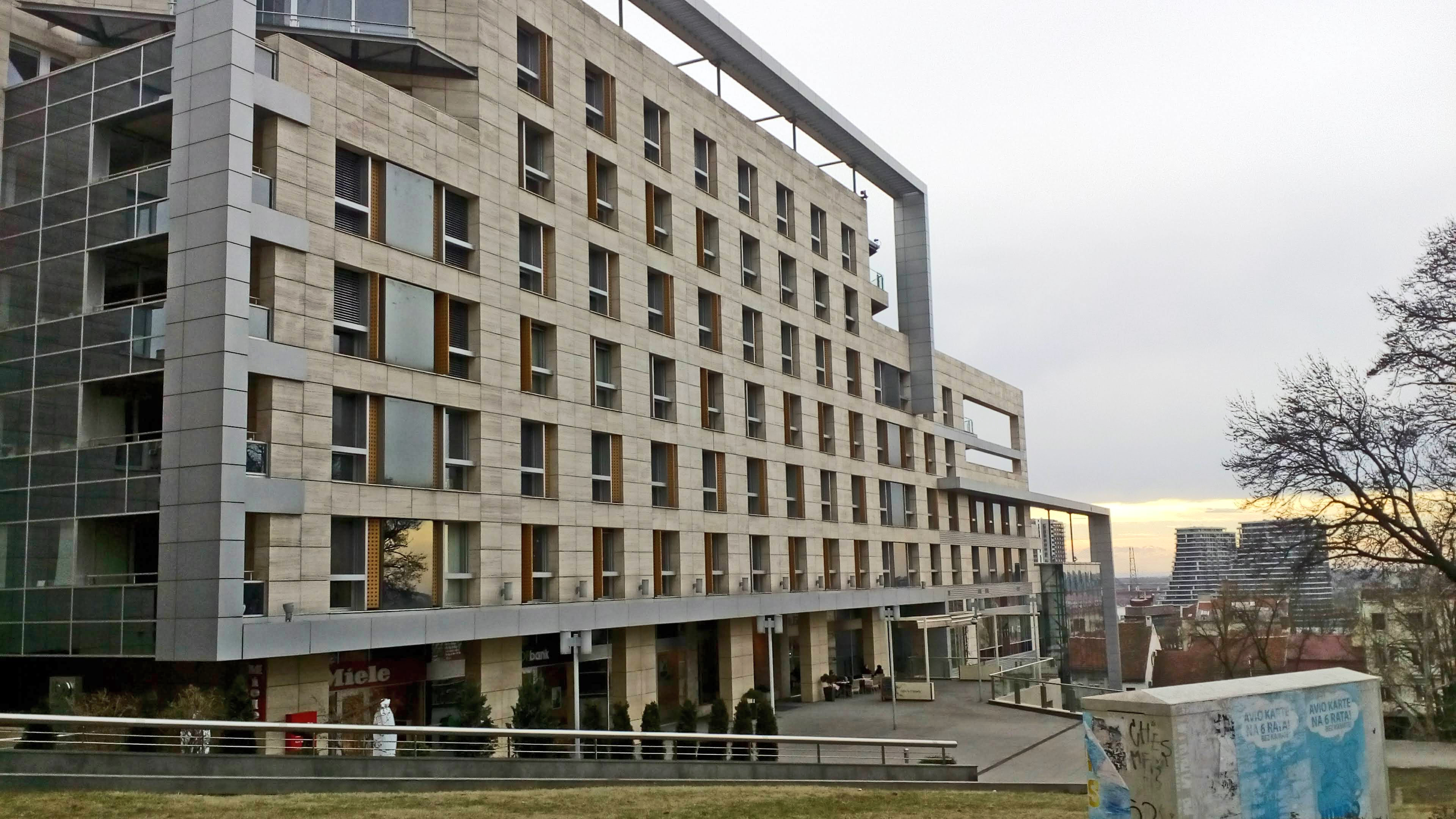
Intelligent Building B2

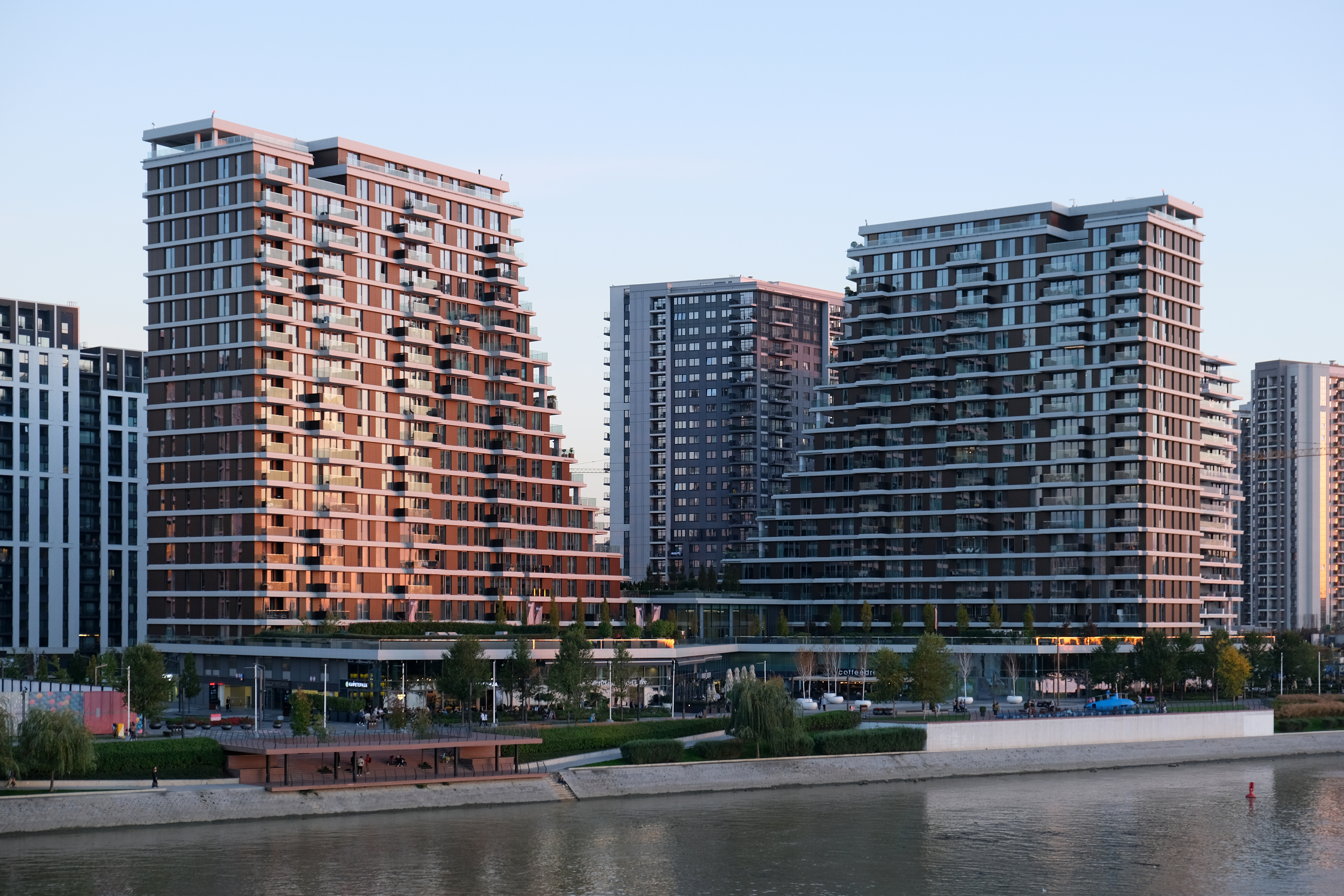
Beograd na vodi

== See also ==
- Architectural projects under construction in Belgrade
- Architecture of Serbia
- Gates of Belgrade
- List of notable buildings in Belgrade
- List of notable streets and squares in Belgrade
- Religious architecture in Belgrade
