= Russian House =

Russian House may refer to:

- Pauline Laws, also known as Russian house law
- Russian House, a building on the Reed College campus in Portland, Oregon, United States
- Russian House, Melbourne, Victoria, Australia
- Russian Houses (Rossotrudnichestvo), cultural centers abroad operated by the Russian government agency Rossotrudnichestvo
  - Russian House (Berlin)
  - Russian Center of Science and Culture, Belgrade
- All Russian Co-operative Society ARCOS, London
