= Museum of Russian Art (Minnesota) =

Museum for Russian art in Minneapolis, Minnesota, U.S.

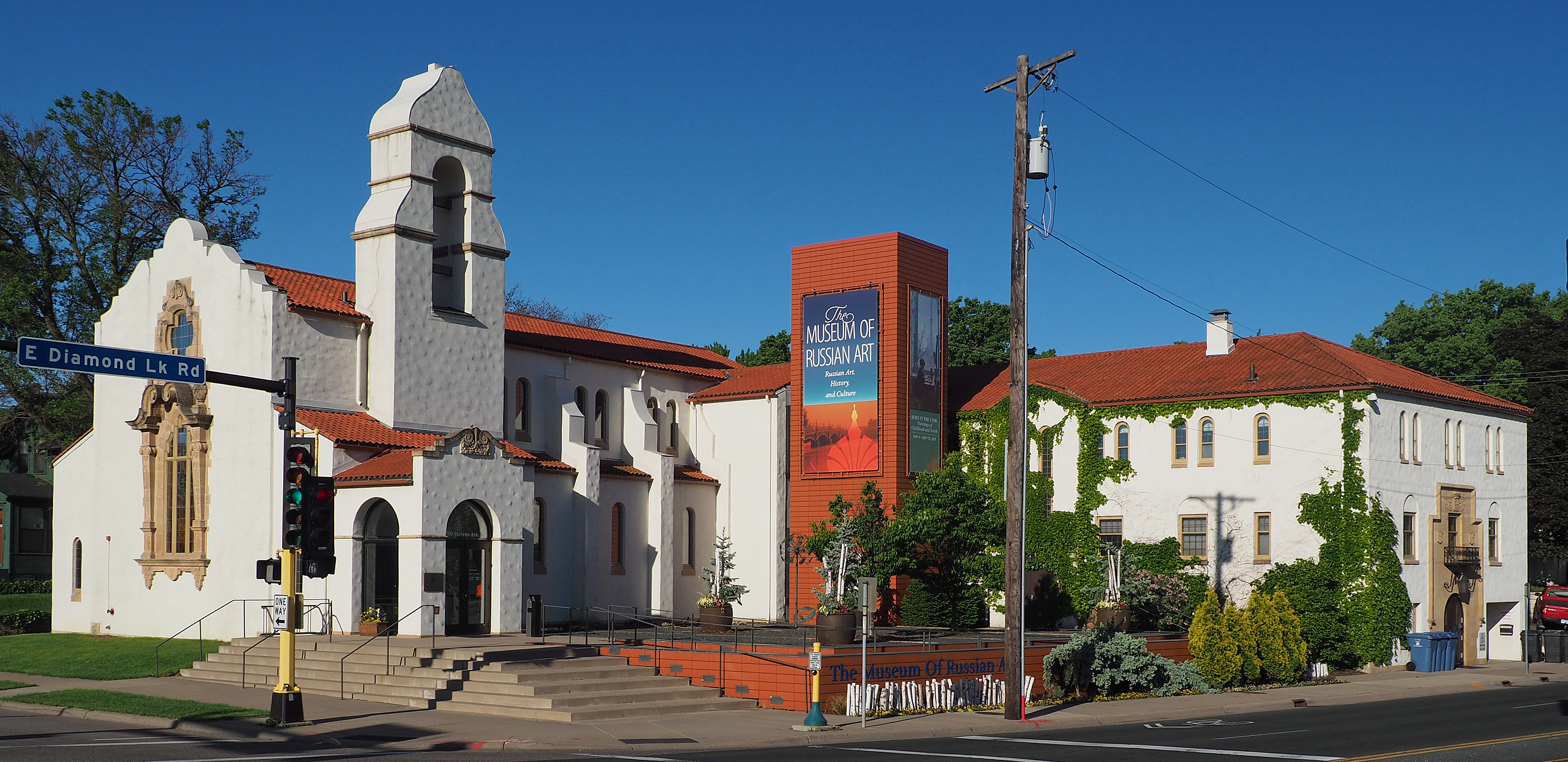
- The Museum of Russian Art
- Established: 2005; 21 years ago
- Location: Minneapolis, Minnesota
- Coordinates: 44°54′12″N 93°16′33″W
- Type: Museum for Russian art
- Collections: Russian Realist Art; Soviet Era Art; Soviet Non-Conformist Art; Christmas/New Years Ornaments; Matryoshka Nesting Dolls
- Visitors: 36,285 (2017)
- Director: Mark J. Meister
- Curators: Maria Zavialova, Ph.D.
- Parking: Free public lot
- Website: tmora.org

The Museum of Russian Art (TMORA) is a nonprofit museum in Minneapolis, Minnesota, United States.

The museum is devoted entirely to Russian art and culture from the entire scope of Russia's history. The Museum was founded by prominent art collectors Raymond and Susan Johnson, owners of the largest collection of Russian Realist paintings outside the borders of the former Soviet Union. TMORA was incorporated as a nonprofit in 2002 and opened at its present location in 2005. The museum shows 8-10 exhibitions per year, and hosts over 50 annual events ranging from notable lecturers to classical concerts to theatrical readings. TMORA is open daily, located between Downtown Minneapolis and the Minneapolis Saint Paul Airport.

== History ==
=== Founding (1991–2005) ===
Raymond and Susan Johnson held the first retail exhibition of Russian Realist Art in North America in 1991. The largest collectors of Soviet-era paintings outside the former USSR, the Johnsons showed their work privately until envisioning a public museum in 2002. It commenced exhibition activities open to the public in 2002, initially in loaned space in a corporate office park located in Bloomington, Minnesota. The organization initially showcased Russian Realist-style paintings from the late 19th century as well as from the Soviet era (1917–1991). Ray Johnson was appointed an Honorary Consul for the Russian Federation in 2003, and in recognition of their respective contributions "to international cultural diversity and education," both Johnson (2005) and TMORA's first Director Bradford Shinkle (2009) were awarded Russia's Order of Friendship Medal, the highest civilian honor accorded to non-Russian citizens.

In 2005, TMORA acquired and thoroughly remodeled the former Mayflower Church in south Minneapolis, a 75-year-old building that previously served as a Congregational church and funeral home. The building received special recognition for adaptive reuse from the Minnesota Heritage Preservation Commission, and opened to the public in 2007. TMORA now operates a state-of-the-art exhibition facility that includes 18,000 square feet (1,700 m^{2}) of display galleries and administrative offices.

=== TMORA: an American Museum of Russian Art (2005–present) ===
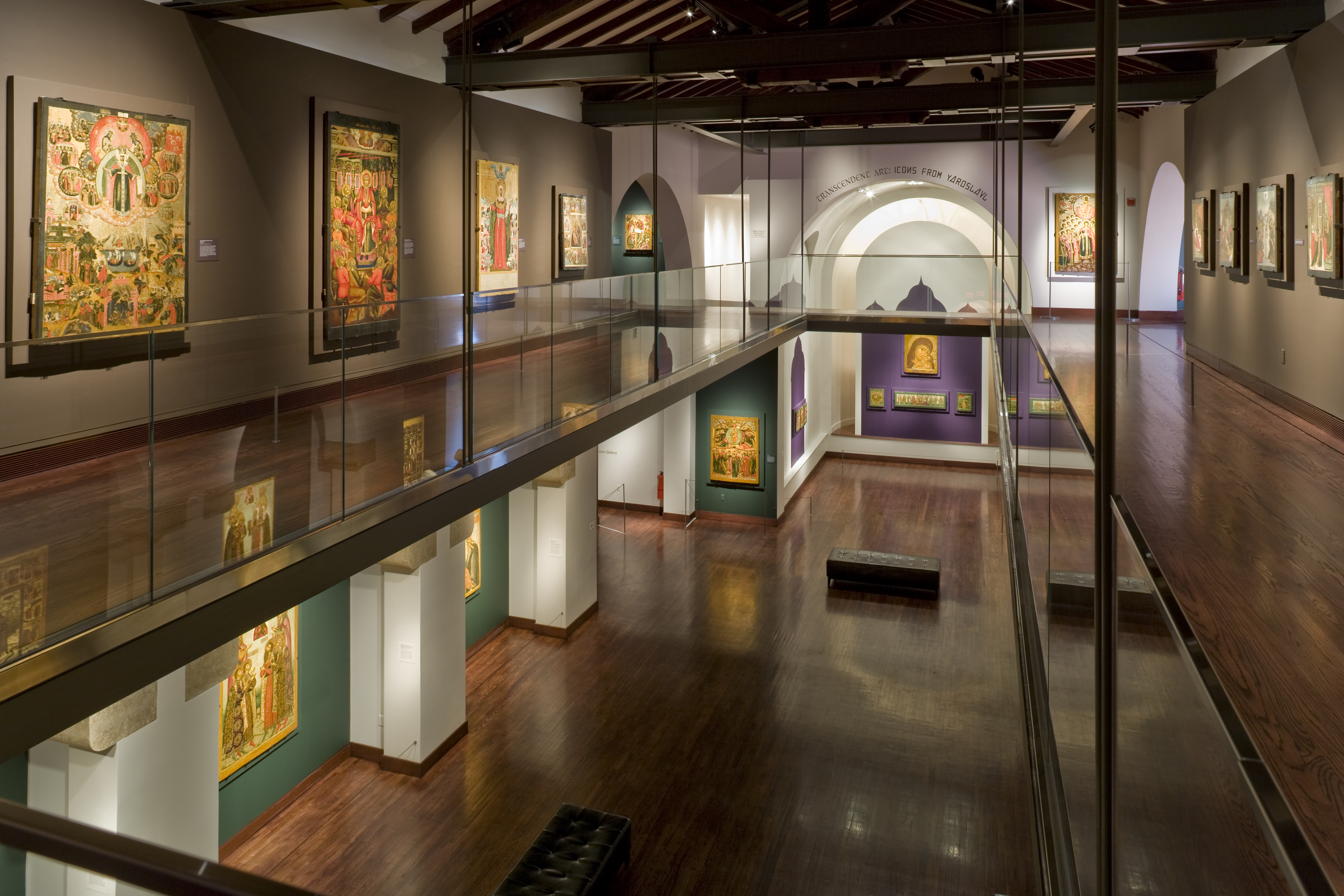
The Museum of Russian Art: Main and Mezzanine Galleries

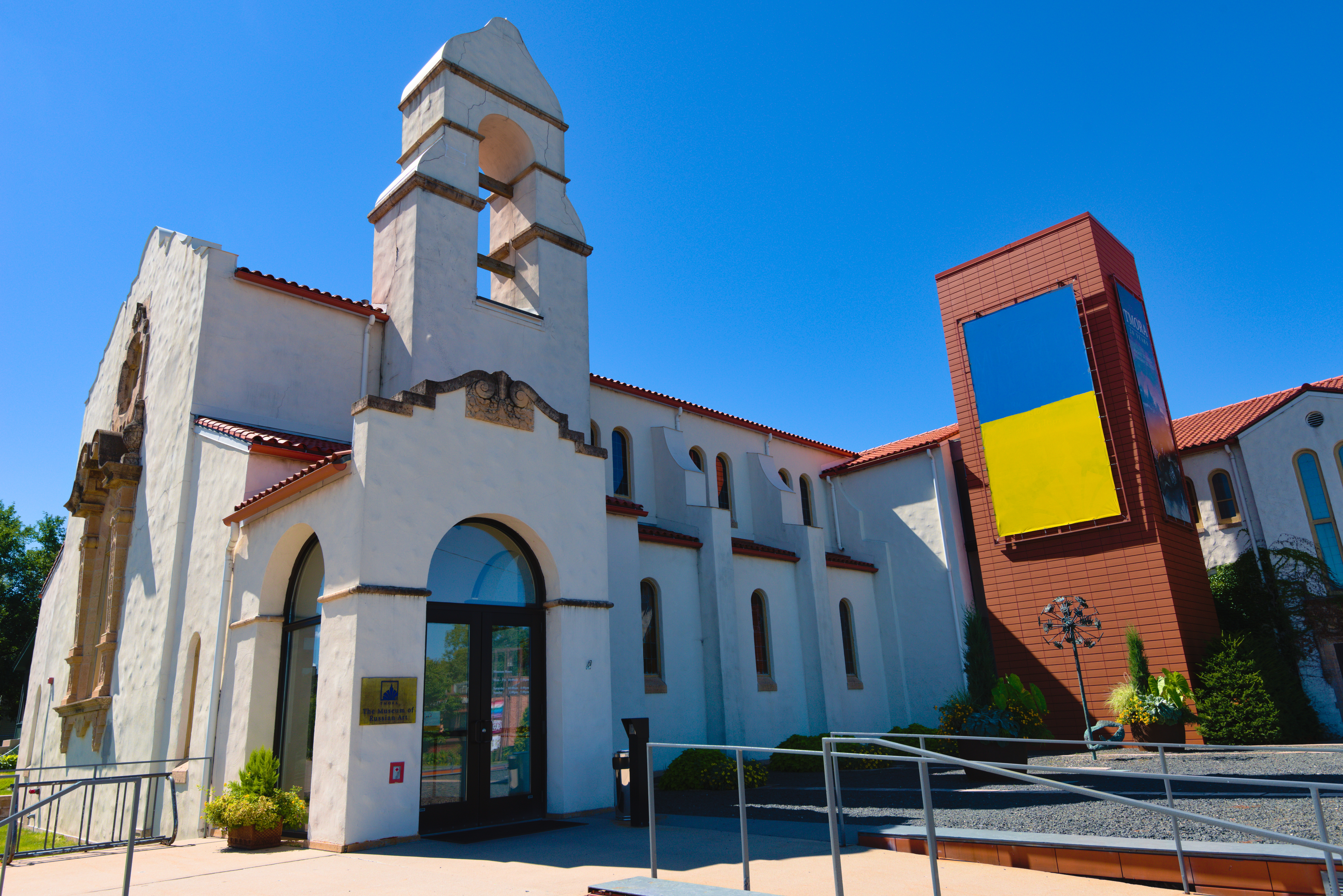
Shortly after the Russian invasion of Ukraine in 2022, the museum replaced their sign with the Flag of Ukraine

The renovated gallery space has been host to over 70 exhibitions from Masterpieces of Soviet Era Painting, to historical topics like World War I and the Siege of Leningrad and Russian art forms such as Faberge, Lacquer Boxes, Nesting Dolls, and Ornaments. TMORA also presents shows by living artists, such as Leon Hushcha (a Minnesotan artist of Ukrainian descent) and Canadian-Armenian artist Garen Bedrossian.

TMORA has established international relationships with numerous Russian cultural organizations and museums including Rossotrudnichestvo, the Russian Embassy in the United States - Washington D.C., the Russian Cultural Center, the State Tretyakov Gallery (Moscow), State Russian Museum (St. Petersburg), State Museum of Yaroslaval (Yaroslaval). The museum works with both private collectors as well as institutions throughout the United States; the mutual cultural embargo established between Russia and the United States in 2010 currently prevents collections from state institutions in Russia to travel to the United States.

In addition to its exhibition calendar, TMORA hosts a variety of events throughout the year including concerts, lectures, theater, dance, artist talks, book clubs, and Russian language classes.

In April 2022, a late night break-in occurred and a donation box of cash was stolen. No other theft was reported.
