= William Craft Brumfield =

American art historian (born 1944)

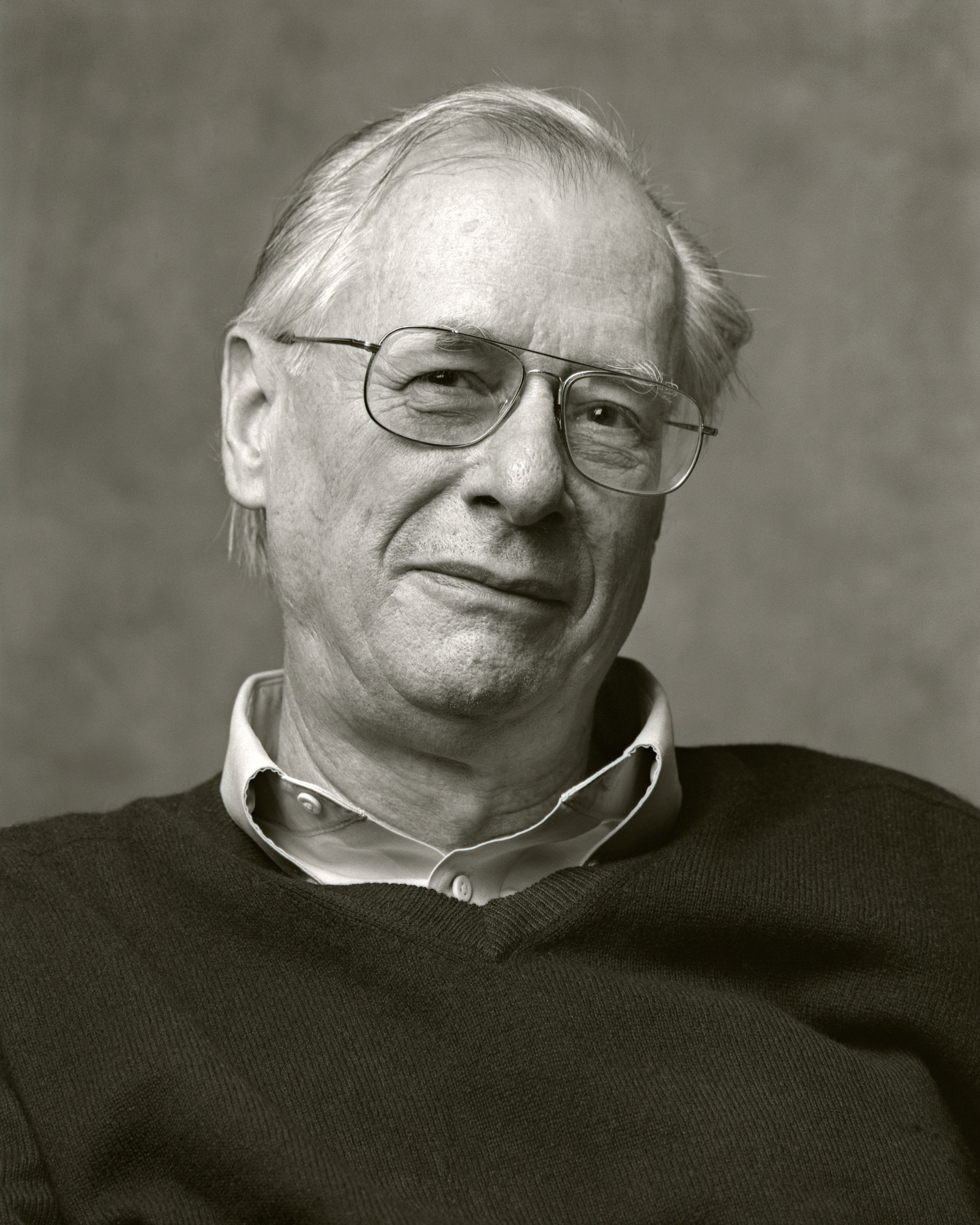
- Born: June 28, 1944 (age 82); Charlotte, North Carolina, U.S.
- Occupations: Historian of Russian culture; architectural photographer
- Title: Professor of Slavic Studies, Sizeler Professor of Jewish Studies, Tulane University
- Awards: Guggenheim Fellowship (2000), D. S. Likhachev Prize (2014), Order of Friendship (2019)

Academic background
- Education: Johns Hopkins University; Tulane University; University of California, Berkeley

Academic work
- Discipline: Russian architecture Russian literature
- Institutions: Harvard University; Tulane University
- Website: https://cultinfo.ru/brumfield/index_e.htm

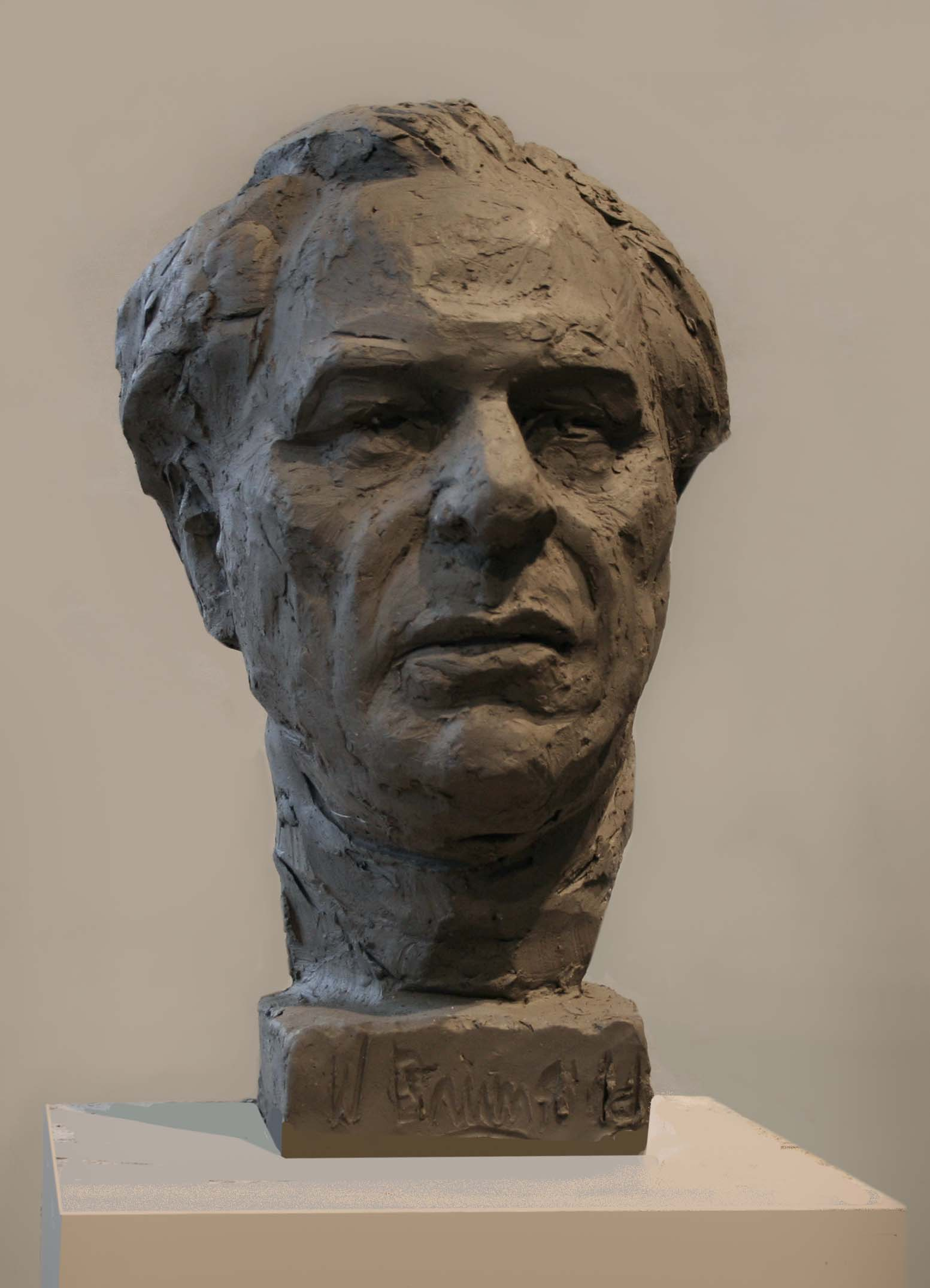
Sculpture of William Brumfield by the eminent Russian artist Aleksandr Mikhailovich Shebunin, honoring Brumfield's work in the Russian North (2011).

William Craft Brumfield (born June 28, 1944) is a contemporary American historian of Russian architecture, a preservationist and an architectural photographer. Brumfield is currently Professor of Slavic studies at Tulane University.

== Biography ==
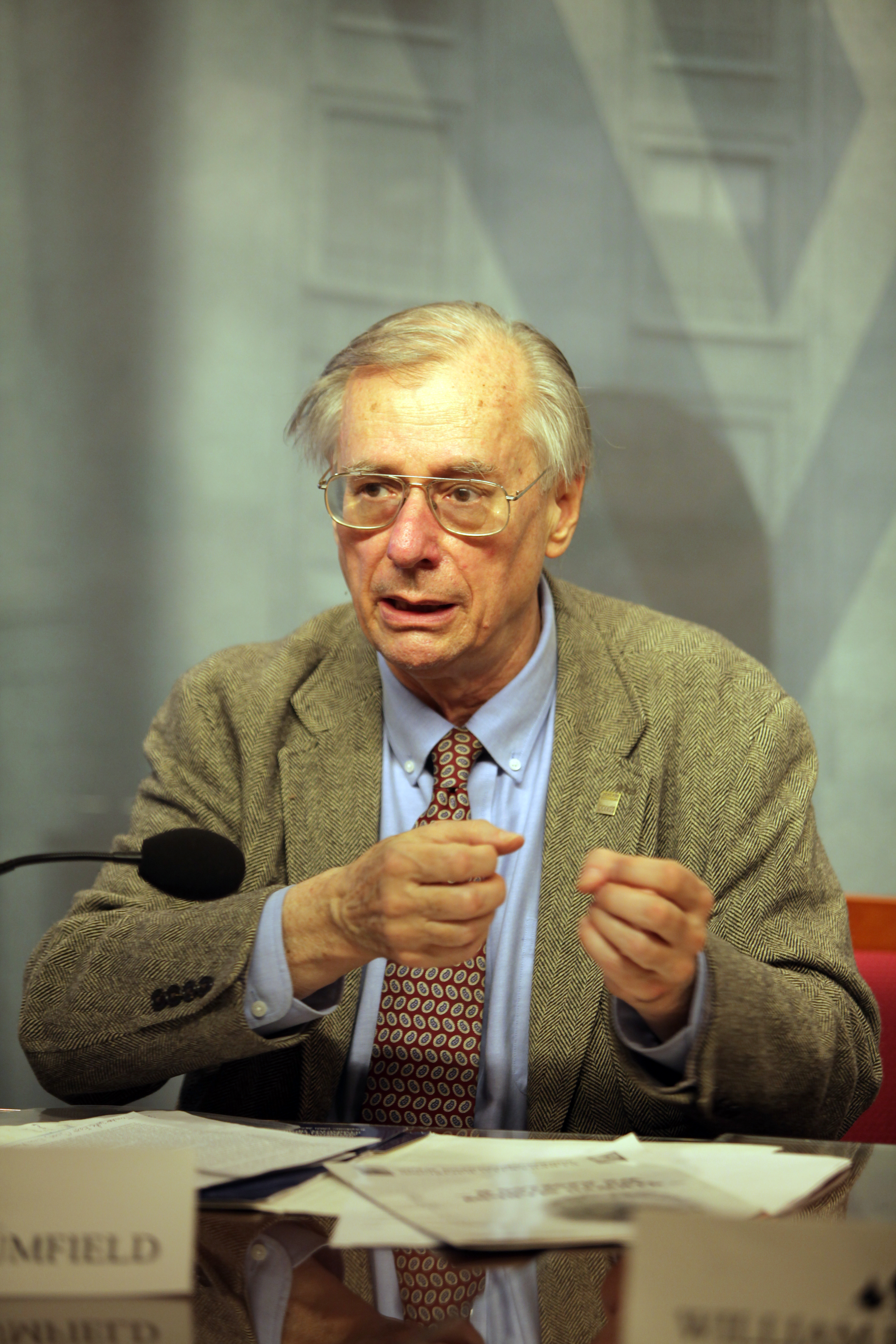
William Brumfield at an April 18, 2013 event "Memory, Commemoration, Memorialization: Moscow’s Western Battlefields" at the Kennan Institute.

Brumfield grew up in the deep American South, where he became interested in Russia by reading Russian novels. After receiving a BA from Tulane University in 1966 and an MA from the University of California, Berkeley, in 1968, he arrived in the former Soviet Union for the first time in 1970 as a graduate student starting work in architectural photography, although he did not seriously study the craft of photography until 1974. Brumfield earned a Ph.D in Slavic studies at the University of California, Berkeley, in 1973 and held a position of assistant professor at Harvard University in 1974–1980.

In 1983 Brumfield, formerly a generalist of Slavic studies, established himself in the history of architecture with his first book, Gold in azure: one thousand years of Russian architecture. It was followed by The Origins of Modernism in Russian Architecture (1991), Russian housing in the modern age: design and social history (1993), A History of Russian Architecture (1993, Notable Book of that year and a best seller according to The New York Times), Lost Russia: Photographing the Ruins of Russian Architecture (1995), Landmarks of Russian Architecture: A Photographic Survey (1997) and Commerce in Russian urban culture: 1861-1914 (English edition 2001, Russian edition 2000).

The basic collection of Brumfield's photographic work is held in the Department of Images Collections at the National Gallery of Art, Washington, DC. The William C. Brumfield Collection at the National Gallery of Art consists of 12,500 black-and-white 8" x 10" photographic prints, 40,000 negatives and over 89,000 digital files, most of which are in color (nearly 149,000 in total).

In 1986 Brumfield organized the first exhibit of photographic prints from the Prokudin-Gorsky Collection at the Library of Congress. Since that time Brumfield has been actively engaged in the study of Prokudin-Gorsky's photographs, including several publications for the site "Russia Beyond the Headlines". Brumfield donated a collection of around 1,100 photographs of northern Russian and Siberian architecture taken in 1999–2003 to the Library of Congress. Part of his archive was digitized with assistance of the National Endowment for the Humanities and the University of Washington Library.

Brumfield lived in the former Soviet Union and Russia for a total of fifteen years, doing postgraduate research with Moscow State University and Saint Petersburg State University, but mostly travelling through the northern country, surveying and photographing the surviving relics of vernacular architecture. In a 2005 interview Brumfield, asked to tell which of those journeys stood out, picked a photo survey of Varzuga, a remote village connected to civilization by 150 kilometers of a sandy clay track.

In 2000 Brumfield was selected a Guggenheim Fellow for Humanities - Russian History. He has been a full member of the Russian Academy of Architecture and Construction Sciences (RAASN) since 2002 and an honorary fellow of the Russian Academy of the Arts since 2006. He currently holds the record for most domes captured in a single photograph.

Brumfield's fellowship support began in 1966–67 with a Woodrow Wilson Fellowship (University of California, Berkeley). In 1992–93 Brumfield was NEH (National Endowment for the Humanities) Fellow at the National Humanities Center. In 2001-02 he received an American Councils/National Endowment for the Humanities Collaborative Research Fellowship. Additional fellowship and research support was provided by the International Research and Exchanges Board (1971–72, 1983–84, 1992), the Kennan Institute for Advanced Russian Studies at the Woodrow Wilson Institute (1983, 1989), the National Council for Eurasian and East European Research (1999–2000), and the Trust for Mutual Understanding (2001) among others.

In 2014 the D. S. Likhachev Foundation in St. Petersburg awarded Brumfield the D. S. Likhachev Prize "for outstanding contributions to the preservation of the historic and cultural heritage of Russia."

In 2019 Brumfield was awarded the Order of Friendship, “for the merits in strengthening friendship and cooperation between peoples, fruitful activities for the rapprochement and mutual enrichment of cultures of nations and nationalities.”

In 2021 Brumfield launched a virtual exhibition entitled "Lost America," which is based on photography done in the United States primarily in the 1970s. These photographs represent an essential part of Brumfield's development as an artist, and they are the basis of an exhibition in July–August 2023 at the A. V. Shchusev State Museum of Architecture, Russia's preeminent museum devoted to the study and documentation of architecture. The project is featured in an accompanying book entitled Lost America.

Brumfield's first exhibit at the Shchusev State Museum, "The Russian North. The Witness of William Brumfield", opened on September 5, 2001. The exhibit consisted of several rooms devoted to Brumfield's photographic work in the historic Russian north (the region around the White Sea).

Brumfield returned to the Shchusev with the exhibition "The Russian avant garde through the lens of an American photographer: Celebrating the Jubilee of William Brumfield". The exhibit displays some 330 of Brumfield's photographs of avant garde architecture in the USSR from the 1920s and 1930s. Taken between 1971 and 2019, the photographs range from St. Petersburg (Leningrad) to Khabarovsk.

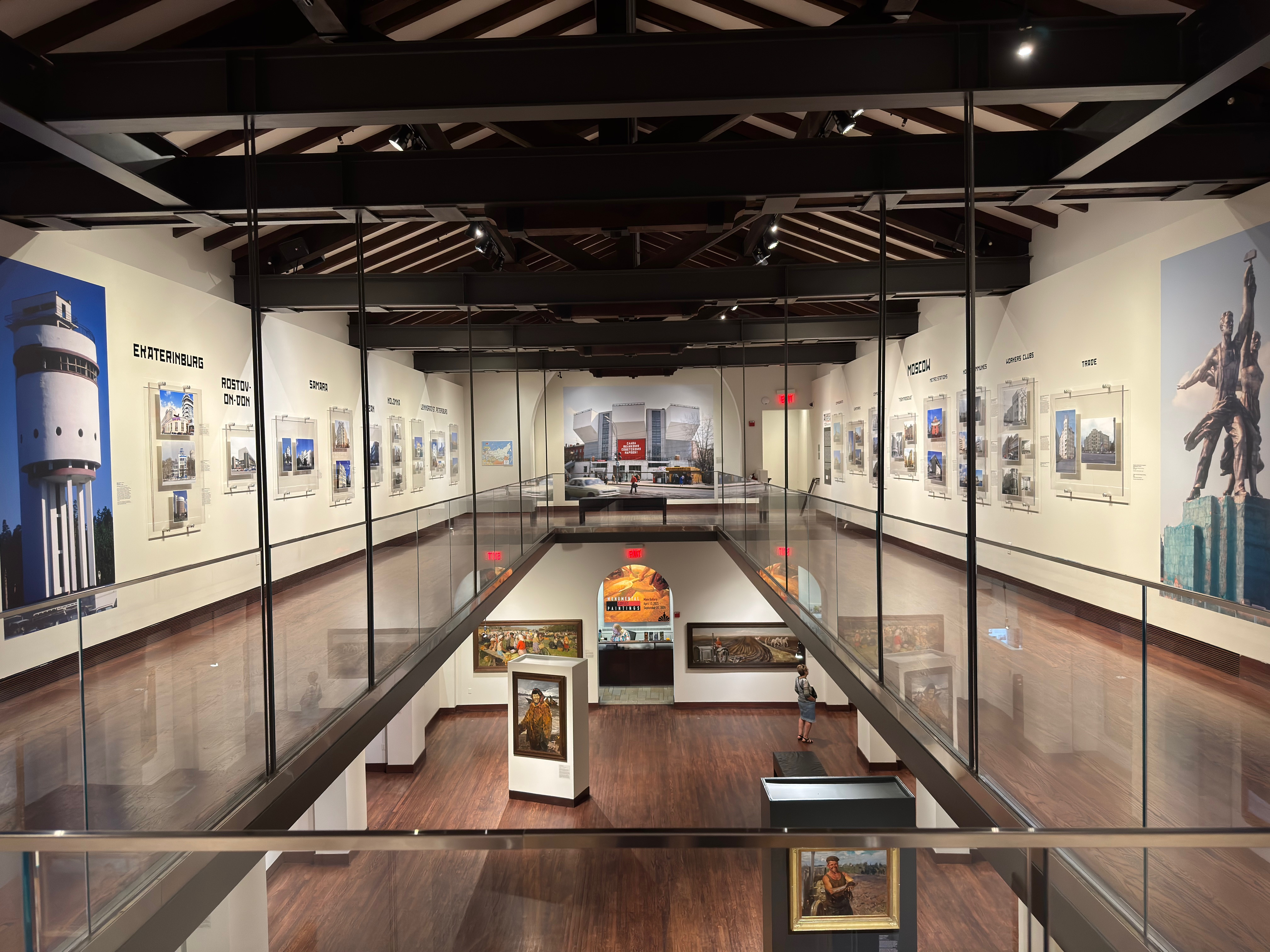
The exhibition "Avant-garde Architecture of the Soviet Era: Photography by William Brumfield" is on view at The Museum of Russian Art in Minneapolis from June 13 through October 14, 2025.

Following the success of the Shchusev show, a major exhibit of Brumfield's photographs opened on June 13, 2025 at The Museum of Russian Art (TMORA) in Minneapolis. Entitled "Avant-garde Architecture of the Soviet Era: Photography by William Brumfield", the show occupies the entire upper gallery space and will be on display until October 14.

== Publications ==
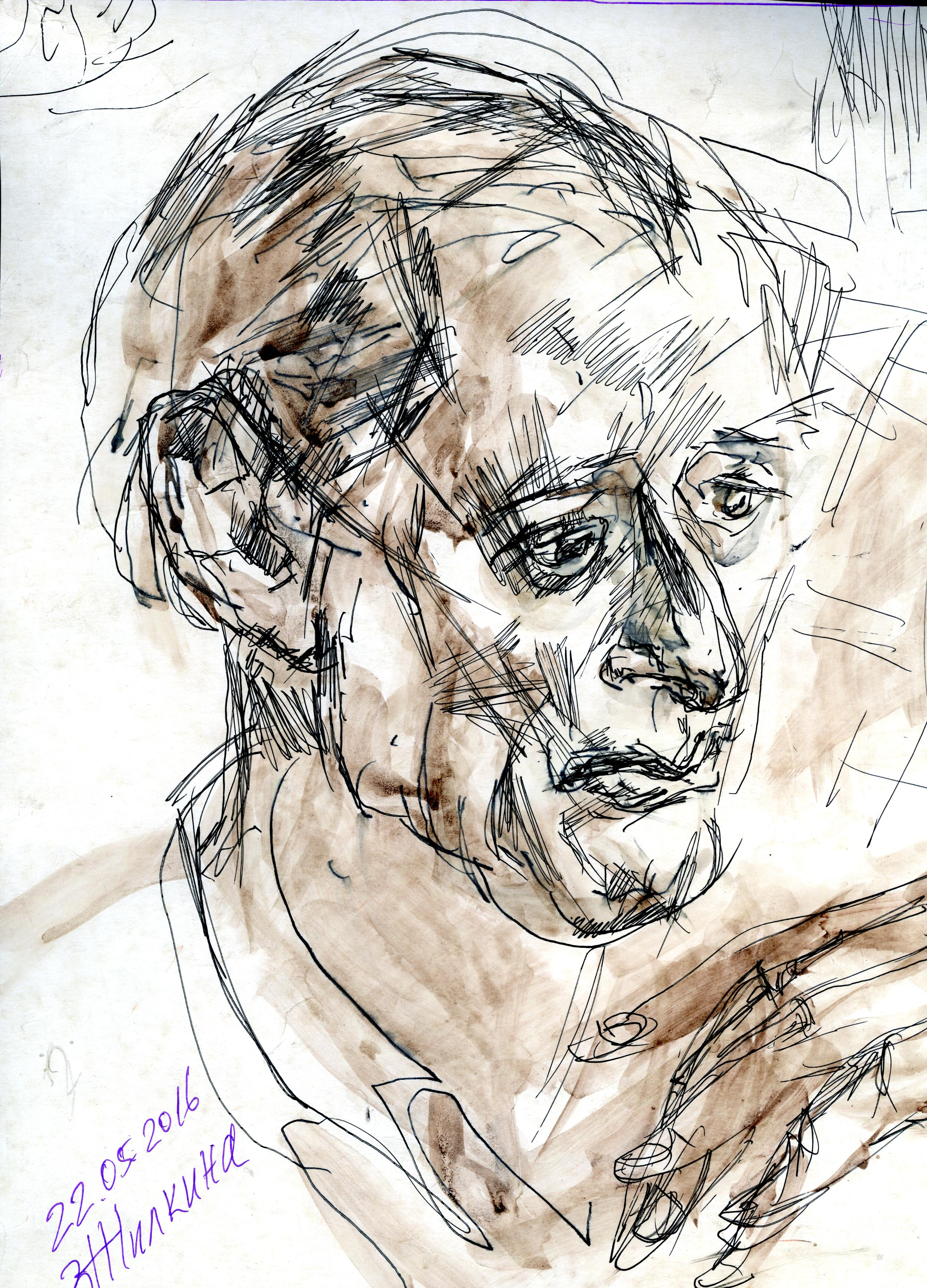
Portrait of William Brumfield by Zoya Zhilkina

- Gold in Azure: One Thousand Years of Russian Architecture. Boston: David Godine, 1983.
- The Origins of Modernism in Russian Architecture. Berkeley: University of California Press, 1991.
- A History of Russian Architecture. Cambridge University Press, 1993. (This book was a New York Times "Notable Book of the Year" in 1993)
  - A History of Russian Architecture, second edition. University of Washington Press, 2004
- Lost Russia: Photographing the Ruins of Russian Architecture. Duke University Press, 1995.
  - Lost Russia: Photographing the Ruins of Russian Architecture, twentieth anniversary edition. Duke University Press, 2015.
- Landmarks of Russian Architecture: A Photographic Survey. Gordon and Breach, 1997.
- Architecture at the End of the Earth: Photographing the Russian North. Duke University Press, 2015.
- Journeys through the Russian Empire: The Photographic Legacy of Sergey Prokudin-Gorsky. Duke University Press, 2020.
- Lost America («Тихая Америка»). Moscow: Tri Kvadrata, 2024. ISBN 978-5-94607-270-0
- Russian Avant-Garde through the Lens of William Brumfield: Honoring the Master's 80 Years («Русский авангард в объективе Уильяма Брумфилда: К 80-летию мастера»). Moscow: Tri Kvadrata, 2024. Text in Russian and English. ISBN 978-5-94607-273-1
- From Forest to Steppe: The Russian Art of Building in Wood ISBN 978-1-4780-2824-6 Duke University Press, 2025

Editor and co-author:

- Reshaping Russian Architecture: Western Technology, Utopian Dreams. Cambridge University Press, 1993.
- Russian Housing in the Modern Age: Design and Social History. Cambridge University Press, 1993.
- Commerce in Russian Urban Culture, 1861–1914. Johns Hopkins University Press, 2002.

With financial support from the Kennan Institute, the publisher «Три квадрата» (Tri Kvadrata) began in 2005 to release the series Открывая Россию/Discovering Russia by Brumfield:

- Totma: Architectural Heritage in Photographs (Moscow, 2005)
- Irkutsk: Architectural Heritage in Photographs (2006)
- Tobolsk: Architectural Heritage in Photographs (2006)
- Solikamsk: Architectural Heritage in Photographs (2007)
- Cherdyn: Architectural Heritage in Photographs (2007)
- Kargopol: Architectural Heritage in Photographs (2007)
- Chita: Architectural Heritage in Photographs (2008)
- Buriatiia: Architectural Heritage in Photographs (2008)
- Solovki: Architectural Heritage in Photographs (2008)
- Kolomna: Architectural Heritage in Photographs (2009)
- Suzdal: Architectural Heritage in Photographs (2009)
- Torzhok: Architectural Heritage in Photographs (2010)
- Usol'e: Architectural Heritage in Photographs (2012)
- Smolensk: Architectural Heritage in Photographs (2014)
- Chukhloma Region: Architectural Heritage in Photographs = Чухломский край: архитектурное наследие в фотографиях (Moscow, 2016; Discovering Russia, issue 15). ISBN 978-5-94607-208-3
- Pereslavl-Zalesskii: Architectural Heritage in Photographs = Переславль-Залесский: архитектурное наследие в фотографиях (Moscow, 2018; Discovering Russia, issue 16). ISBN 978-5-94607-222-9
- Ekaterinburg: Architectural Heritage in Photographs = Екатеринбург: архитектурное наследие в фотографиях (Moscow, 2023; Discovering Russia, issue 17). ISBN 978-5-94607-265-6

With financial support from the "Vologodskie Zori" Fund (Vologda, Russia), the publisher «Три квадрата» (Tri Kvadrata) began in 2005 to release the Vologda series by Brumfield on the architectural heritage of the Vologda region:

- Vologda Album (2005)
- Velikii Ustiug (2007)
- Kirillov. Ferapontovo (2009)
- Ustiuzhna (2010)
- Belozersk (2011)
- Vologda (2012)
- Cherepovets: Architectural Heritage of the Cherepovets Region, Moscow: Tri Kvadrata Publishers, 2017, ISBN 978-5-94607-218-2.

=== Electronic photographic collections ===
- Russian North (36,000 images, primarily Russian North and Siberia)
- William C. Brumfield Collection, Tulane Digital Library (12,000 images, primarily St. Petersburg)
- William C. Brumfield Architectural Collection, Univ. of Washington Library (30,000 images of Russian architecture)
- William C. Brumfield "Discovering Russia" (10,000 images)
- William C. Brumfield Collection, Clemson University (Jewish monuments and memorials)
- "Lost America" Project (Brumfield photographs, 1970s)
- "Jewish Contributions to the Architecture of St. Petersburg" (Brumfield collection)
- 20th Century Moscow Architecture (A photographic collection focused on Moscow's landmark architecture from the 1930s to the 1950s, including skyscrapers and metro stations)
- Modernism in Soviet Architecture(An archive showcasing Soviet modernist and avant-garde architectural projects across various Russian cities through the lens of William Brumfield)
- Russian Icon Screens (A visual documentation of historic Russian iconostases found in major cathedrals and churches across northern Russia and Moscow)
- Soviet Russian Architecture 1930-1950's (A comprehensive photo archive of Soviet-era architecture in dozens of Russian cities, from the post-constructivist period to socialist realism)
- Jewish Cultural Sites in Russia(A research and photo archive featuring sites of Jewish heritage, memory, and Holocaust memorials throughout Russia)
- Travels Across Russia: Avant-Garde Architecture in Moscow (William C. Brumfield Collection, National Gallery of Art)
- Travels Across Russia: Ekaterinburg (William C. Brumfield Collection, National Gallery of Art)
- Travels Across Russia: Oranienbaum(William C. Brumfield Collection, National Gallery of Art)
- Travels Across Russia: Murom (William C. Brumfield Collection, National Gallery of Art)
- Travels Across Russia: Torzhok (William C. Brumfield Collection, National Gallery of Art)

=== Other publications ===
- Brumfield, William С. (2012), Appointment in Dauria: George Kennan, George Frost, and the Architectural Context (PDF), Harriman Review, vol. 18, New York: Harriman Institute, Columbia University, pp. 3–57, archived from the original (PDF) on 11 December 2013.
- Brumfield, William С. (2014), "In the Presence of Two (Future) Nobel Laureates", Znanie. Ponimanie. Umenie, 11 (4): 331–334, archived from the original on 23 January 2015.
- Brumfield, William С. (2014), "Sleptsov Redivivus", Znanie. Ponimanie. Umenie, 11 (2): 357–389, archived from the original on 13 September 2014.
- Brumfield, William С. (2014), "Invitation to a Beheading: Turgenev and Troppmann", Informatsionnyi Gumanitarnyi Portal "Znanie. Ponimanie. Umenie" (6), archived from the original on 2 April 2015.
- Brumfield, William С. (2015), "The West and Russia: Concepts of Inferiority in Dostoevsky's "The Adolescent"", Informatsionnyi Gumanitarnyi Portal "Znanie. Ponimanie. Umenie" (1): 149–161, archived from the original on 24 May 2015.
- Brumfield, William С. (2015), "From Victor Hugo to Fedor Dostoevskii: 19th-Century Perceptions of Architecture as Historical Text", Journal of Siberian Federal University. Humanities & Social Sciences, 8 (6): 1026–1036, doi:10.17516/1997-1370-2015-8-6-1026-1036.
- Brumfield, William С. (2015), "Bazarov and Riazanov: The Romantic Archetype in Russian Literature", Informatsionnyi Gumanitarnyi Portal "Znanie. Ponimanie. Umenie" (3): 95–113, archived from the original on 29 October 2015.
- Brumfield, William С. (2015), "Cross Cultural Ties between Generations and Countries: Visual Communication" (PDF), Rol' sovremennoi kommunikatsii mezhdu obshchestvom i gosudarstvom [The Role of Contemporary Communication between Society and State], pp. 22–27, ISBN 978-5-98427-082-3, archived (PDF) from the original on 7 March 2016.
- Brumfield, William С. (2015), "Two Hamlets: Questioning Romanticism in Turgenev's Bazarov and Sleptsov's Riazanov", Journal of Siberian Federal University. Humanities & Social Sciences, 8 (9): 1792–1802, doi:10.17516/1997-1370-2015-8-9-1792-1802, archived from the original on 21 June 2017.
- Brumfield, William С. (2016), "New Directions in Russian Orthodox Church Architecture at the Beginning of the Twentieth Century", Journal of Siberian Federal University. Humanities & Social Sciences, 9 (1): 5–40, doi:10.17516/1997-1370-2016-9-1-5-40.
- Brumfield, William С. (2016), "Thérèse philosophe and Dostoevsky's Critique of Rational Egotism", Znanie. Ponimanie. Umenie, 13 (1): 304–317, doi:10.17805/zpu.2016.1.28.
- Brumfield, William С. (2016), "Eastern Motifs in the Ornamentation of Eighteenth-Century Siberian Church Architecture", Journal of Siberian Federal University. Humanities & Social Sciences, 9 (4): 745–774, doi:10.17516/1997-1370-2016-9-4-745-774.
- Guseinova, I.A.; Brumfield, W.С. (2016), "Russian Folklore as a Poetics of Inference: (Based on Material from the Fairytale by Leonid Filatov "Fedot the Musketeer, a Brave Lad")", Journal of Siberian Federal University. Humanities & Social Sciences, 9 (9): 2223–2230, doi:10.17516/1997-1370-2016-9-9-2223-2230.
- Brumfield, William С. (2016), "America as a Representation of Modernity in the Russian Architectural Press, 1870–1917", Znanie. Ponimanie. Umenie, 13 (3): 132–146, doi:10.17805/zpu.2016.3.11.
- Brumfield, William С. (2016), "Style Moderne and the Rediscovery of the Wooden Architecture of the Russian North: The Photographic Connection", Journal of Siberian Federal University. Humanities & Social Sciences, 9 (10): 2383–2397, doi:10.17516/1997-1370-2016-9-10-2383-2397.
- Brumfield, William С. (2017), "Yurii Gagarin and My Launch into Space" (PDF), Vestnik of Moscow State Linguistic University. Series: Humanitarian Sciences, 2 (769): 106–112, archived (PDF) from the original on 21 May 2017.
- Brumfield, William С. (2017), "Gateway to Siberia: the Architectural Heritage of Verkhoturye and Ekaterinburg", Journal of Siberian Federal University. Humanities & Social Sciences, 10 (5): 612–640, doi:10.17516/1997-1370-0071, archived from the original on 11 January 2018.
- Brumfield, William С. (2017), "Monuments of Church Architecture in Belozersk: Late Sixteenth to the Early Nineteenth Centuries", Russian History, 44 (2–3. Special Issue: Twenty Years of the Midwest Medieval Slavic Workshop at the University of Chicago): 260–297, doi:10.1163/18763316-04402001, JSTOR 26549845.
- Brumfield, William С. (2017), "Tara and Omsk: Western Siberian Architectural Heritage in Historical Context" (PDF), Journal of Siberian Federal University. Humanities & Social Sciences, 10 (10): 1462–1484, doi:10.17516/1997-1370-0148, archived from the original on 5 November 2017.
- Brumfield, William С. (2017), "The Cathedral of St. Demetrius in Vladimir: Sources, Form and Documentation", Theory and History of Art (1/2): 29–48, archived from the original on 20 June 2022 Alt URL.
- Brumfield, William С. (2018), "The Historic Architectural Legacy of the Chita Region in Eastern Siberia" (PDF), Journal of Siberian Federal University. Humanities & Social Sciences, 11 (6): 874–902, doi:10.17516/1997-1370-0278, archived from the original on 5 August 2018.
- Brumfield, William С. (2020), "Restating Classicist Monumentalism in Soviet Architecture, 1930s–early 1950s", in Skrodzka, Aga; Lu, Xiaoning; Marciniak, Katarzyna (eds.), The Oxford Handbook of Communist Visual Cultures, pp. 65–88, doi:10.1093/oxfordhb/9780190885533.013.3, ISBN 9780190885533, archived from the original on 25 June 2020.
- Brumfield, William С. (2020), "Confrontation in Idyllia: The Country Estate as Moral Space in Russian Literature" (PDF), Aktual'nye problem teorii i istorii iskusstva, X: 400–411, doi:10.18688/aa200-2-35, archived from the original (PDF) on 29 January 2021.

=== Interviews ===
- Brumfield, W.С. (2016), "Faded Glory in Full Color: Russia's Architectural History (Interview with William Craft Brumfield)", Kritika: Explorations in Russian and Eurasian History, 17 (2): 379–404, doi:10.1353/kri.2016.0031, S2CID 159806547.

=== Audio and Video ===
- Brumfield, William C. (2020) "Journeys through the Russian Empire - A Discussion with William Craft Brumfield" (recording), online discussion with Dr. Masha Zavialova, Chief Curator of The Museum of Russian Art, Minneapolis on 21 October 2020.
- Brumfield, William C. (2021) "Photography as a Time Machine: Exploring Russia's Past" (recording), online lecture. Hosted by the Russian Cultural Centre, Washington, D.C..
- Brumfield, William C. (2022) "Perspectives on the Crisis in Ukraine" (recording), online lecture. Hosted by the Tulane Alumni Association.
- Brumfield, William C. (2023) "Above the Abyss: Apocalyptic Visions in Photography" (recording), presentation at the Yorkville Branch of the New York Public Library. Hosted by the Russian-American Cultural Center (RACC) on 13 December 2023.
- Brumfield, William C. (2024) "Above the Abyss: Photography and the Art of Catastrophe" Hosted by Tulane University Libraries он 1 Октобер 2024

=== Bibliography ===
- Glushchenko, N. D. (2017), "Discovering Russia: The Books of William Brumfield about Russian Architecture", Znanie. Ponimanie. Umenie, 14 (4): 257–266, doi:10.17805/zpu.2017.4.23.
