= Russian Centre for Science and Culture, Copenhagen =

Coordinates: 55°40′41″N 12°34′01″E

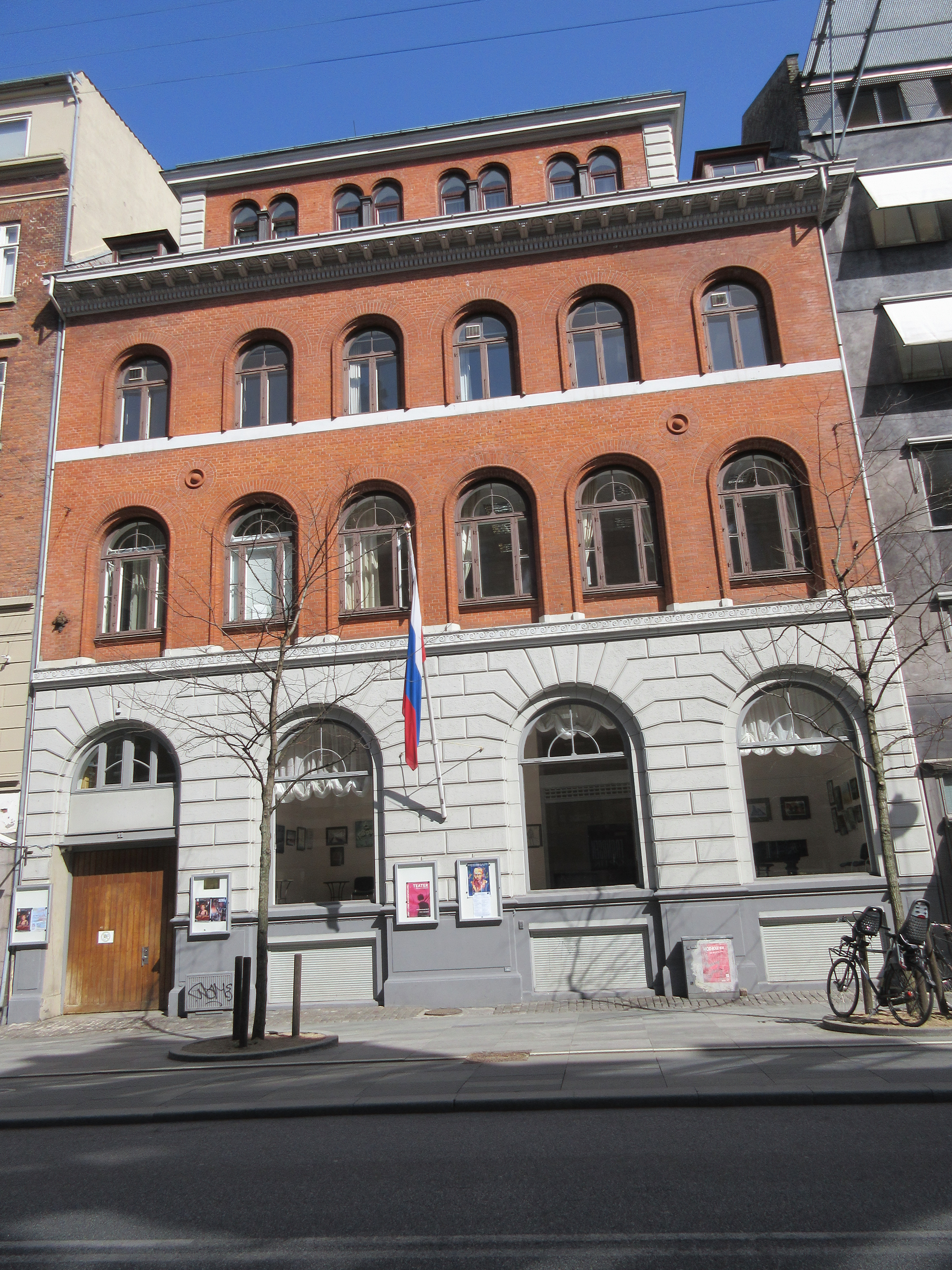
The building at Vester Voldgade 11 in Copenhagen

The Russian Centre for Science and Culture was located at Vester Voldgade 11 in central Copenhagen, Denmark. Having been one of Rossotrudnichestvo's Russian Houses, it was closed in 2023.

== Building ==
The building was originally constructed for the Royal Danish Academy of Music in 1886-1887 to design by C. L. Thuren (1846-1926). Musikforeningen was for many years based in the ground floor. The composer Niels W. Gade, one of the founders of the music academy, lived on the second floor from 1887.

The Royal Academy of Music relocated to its new building on Vester Boulevard (now H.C. Andersens Boulevard) in March 1905. Nordisk Gummi & Guttapercha Kompagni. a company founded in 1859, was then headquartered in the building until 1932.

The centre was closed in September 2023, as the Russian embassy in Copenhagen announced.
