= Vasily Baumgarten =

Russian-Yugoslav architect and military engineer (1879–1962)

Vasily Baumgarten Wilhelm von Baumgarten
- Born: October 30, 1879; Saint Petersburg
- Died: May 13, 1962 (aged 82); Buenos Aires
- Education: Nikolaevsky Engineering Academy
- Occupation: Architect
- Spouse: Xenia (Kika) M. Benois
- Awards: Order of St. Stanislaus, 2nd and 3rd classes; Order of St. Anna, 2nd and 3rd classes; Order of St. Vladimir, 4th class.
- Buildings: (Old) General Staff building, Belgrade; Russian House (Ruski dom), Belgrade
- Design: Neoclassicism

Vasily (Wilhelm) Fyodorovich von Baumgarten (Russian: Василий (Вильгельм) Фёдорович фон Баумгартен; October 30 [17], 1879 — May 13, 1962) was Russian Empire and Yugoslavian architect and military engineer.

== Biography ==
=== Russian Empire ===
Vasily was born in St. Petersburg, Russia. He graduated from the Emperor Alexander II's Cadet Corps at 1897, then from the Nicholas Pavlovich's engineering school at 1900 and Nikolaevsky Engineering Academy at 1905 in St. Petersburg.

During the Russo-Japanese War (1904–05) Vasily Baumgarten served in the Vladivostok Fortress, then in 1908–1914 he worked in the city administration of St. Petersburg and he taught at his alma mater as associate professor. Baumgarten has taken part in construction of Naval and artillery ranges, then together with Vladimir Apyshkov built the house of Peter Stenbock-Fermore in St. Petersburg in 1913–14, later he also built several private houses in Pavlovsk.

During the World War I colonel Baumgarten was appointed as a head of engineer troops at the 3rd Army headquarters. He has been awarded with the 2nd and 3rd classes of the Order of St. Stanislaus, 2nd and 3rd classes of the Order of St. Anna and 4th class of the Order of St. Vladimir. Because of the October Revolution and Russian Civil War in September 1918 Vasily Baumgarten joined the White movement. In January 1919 he joined the Anton Denikin's Volunteer Army as a procurement manager for engineer units.

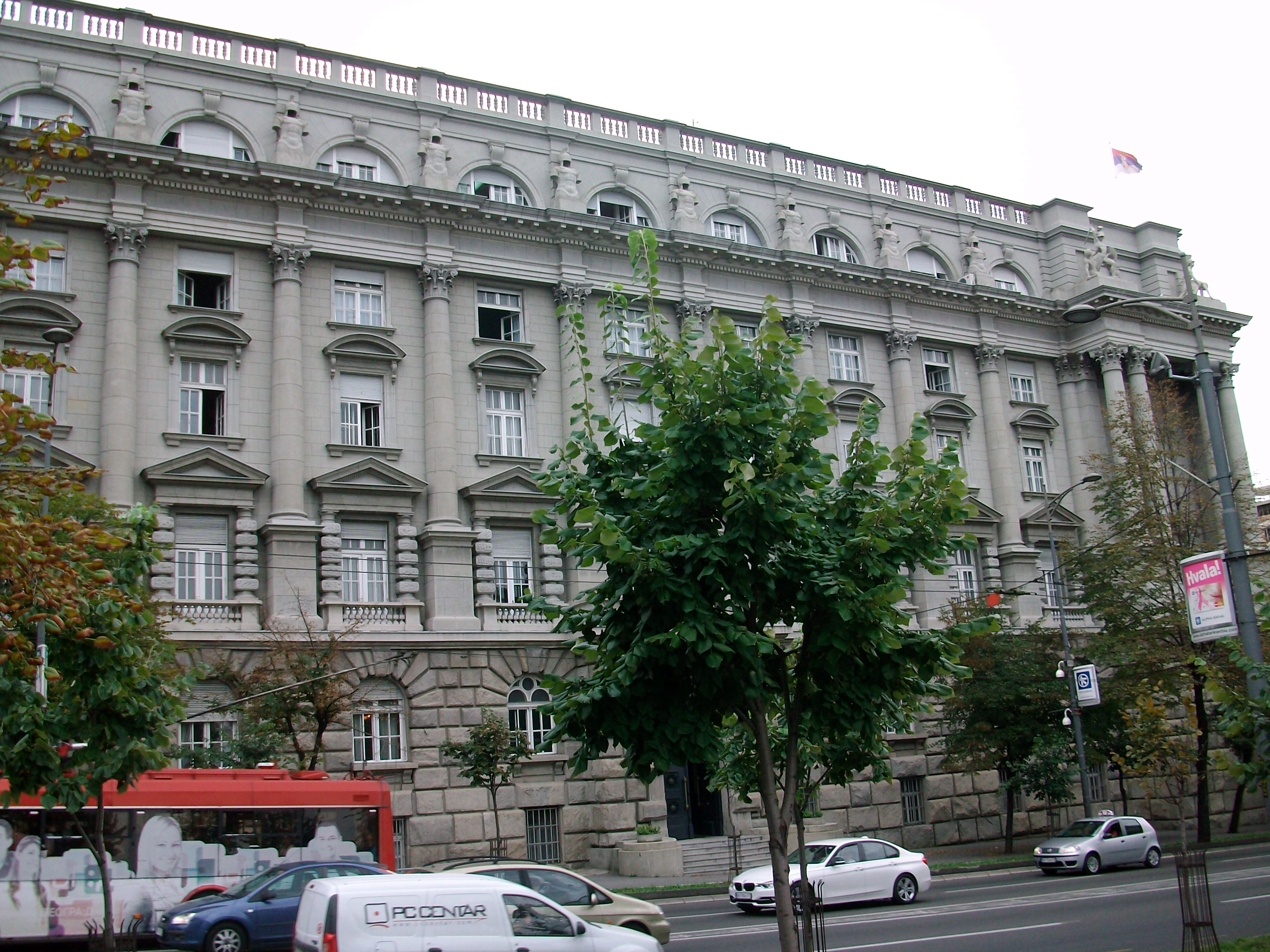
General Staff building (2014)

In November 1920 Baumgarten evacuated from Sevastopol to Istanbul, Turkey together with the staff of Peter Wrangel's Russian army retreating from Crimea. Then he became a major general (military rank) and a corps engineer of the 1st Army Corps at Gallipoli. Later he emigrated to the Kingdom of Serbs, Croats and Slovenes (since 1929 — Kingdom of Yugoslavia).

=== Kingdom of Yugoslavia ===
In Belgrade, Vasily Baumgarten has worked as an architect in chief at the Ministry of Army and Navy in rank of major general of the Royal Yugoslav Army, as well as an architect of the corresponding department in the Ministry of Civil Construction. He has become best known as an originator of the Royal Yugoslav Armed Forces General Staff headquarter building design and the design of the Emperor Nicholas II's Russian House (Ruski dom) in Belgrade.

The interbellum politics of Vasily Baumgarten were panslavistic. Among other things he also took part in the Association of Russian artists in the Kingdom of SCS' exhibition in 1928 and the Great Exhibition of Russian Art in 1930 in Belgrade, in 1930–31 Vasily became a member of the art group К.Р.У.Г. He was also a leader of the voluntary support group for the students of Nikolaevsky Engineering School and the Academy.

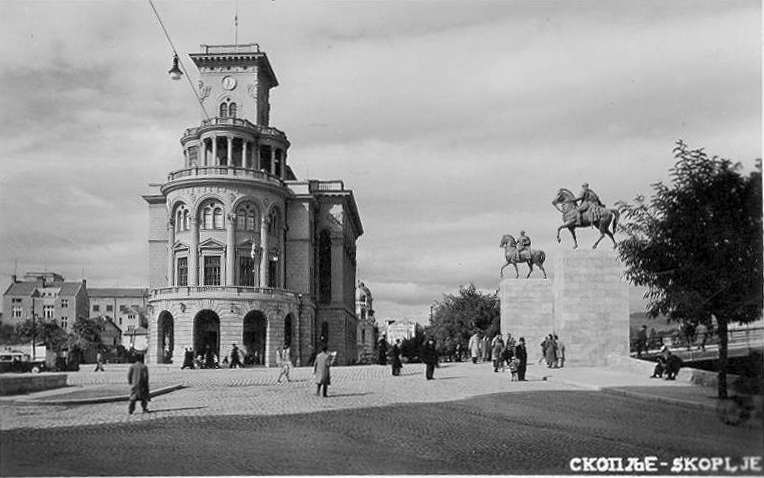
Officers Hall in Skopje (1930)

Here is the list of key Yugoslav architectural projects executed by Vasily Baumgarten:

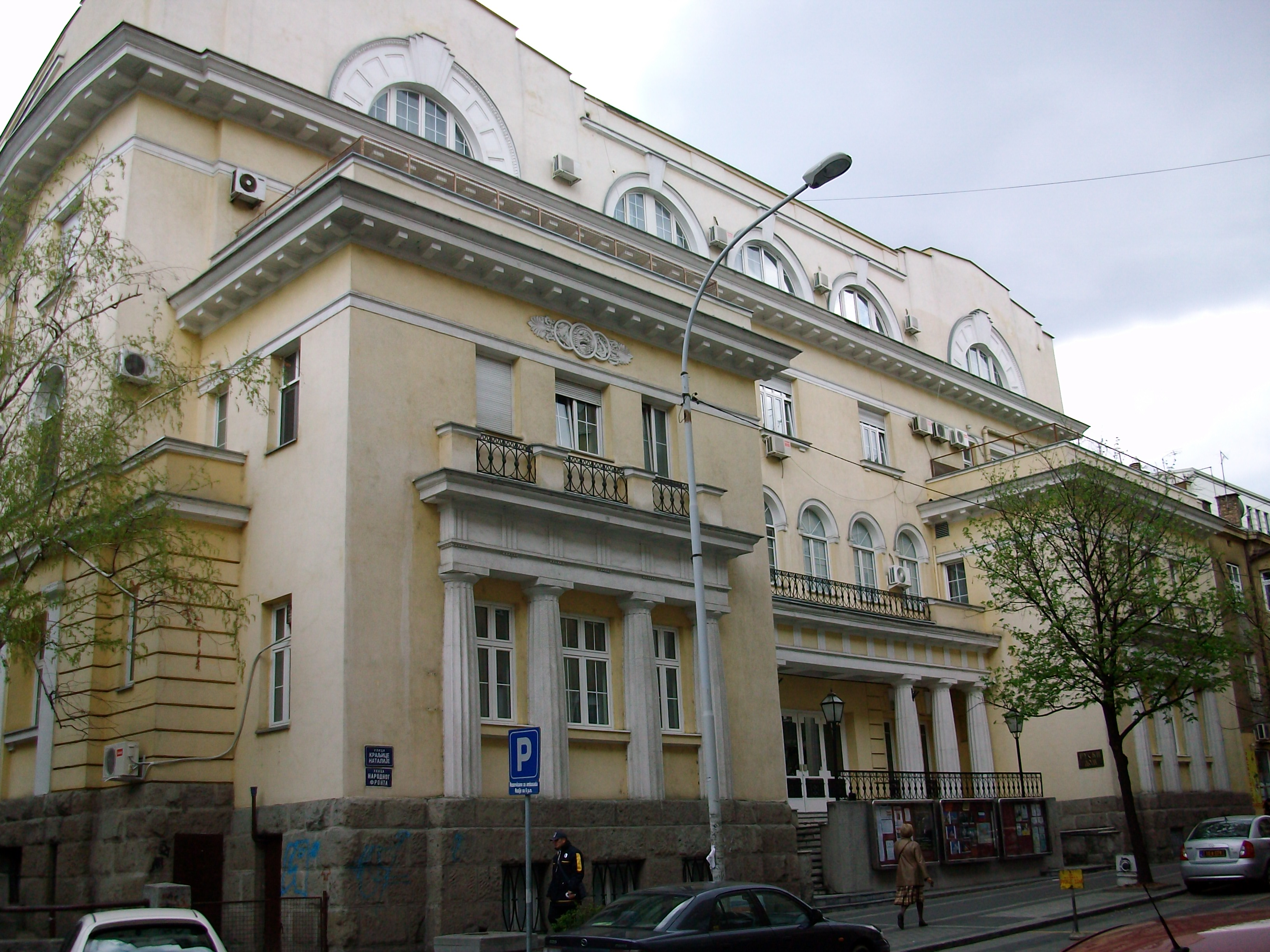
Russian House (2012)

- (Old) General Staff building, Belgrade (built in 1924–28);
- Officers Hall, Skopje, Macedonia (or Army Hall; 1925–29);
- Mite Lukić House in the municipality of Voždovac in Belgrade (1931);
- Konak (residence) of the Serbian Orthodox Gračanica monastery in Kosovo and Metohija near Priština (1933);
- Emperor Nicholas II's Russian House (Ruski dom) in Belgrade (1931–33);
- Branch building of the State Mortgage Bank of Yugoslavia in Valjevo (1939);
- Branch building of the State Mortgage Bank in Pančevo (1940; together with the engineer Solodov).

=== The last years of his life ===
For a long time in Yugoslavia it was believed the architect Baumgarten has not survived World War II times, although the date and place of his death haven't been known. However, later it turned out that after 1945 Wilhelm Baumgarten emigrated to Argentina together with his family. The last years of his life he spent in Buenos Aires. There Baumgarten served as a chairman of The Gallipoli Association in South America and (since 1949) was the leader of the Peter Wrangel's Russian All-Military Union local department.

He died on May 13, 1962. Buried at the Cementerio Británico not far from La Chacarita Cemetery in Buenos Aires.

== Family ==
Vasily Baumgarten married shortly before the October Revolution in Russia. Xenia (Kika) Michaylovna Benois (1894–1965), last name changed to Baumgarten as she got married, was his wife, a niece of the artist Alexandre Benois. The couple had sons and there is an information of a granddaughter named Marina.

== See also ==
- Russian Center of Science and Culture, Belgrade
- fr:Nikola Krasnov
- ru:Сташевский, Валерий Владимирович
