= Russian House (Berlin) =

Russian cultural centre in Berlin, Germany

- Russisches Haus der Wissenschaft und Kultur
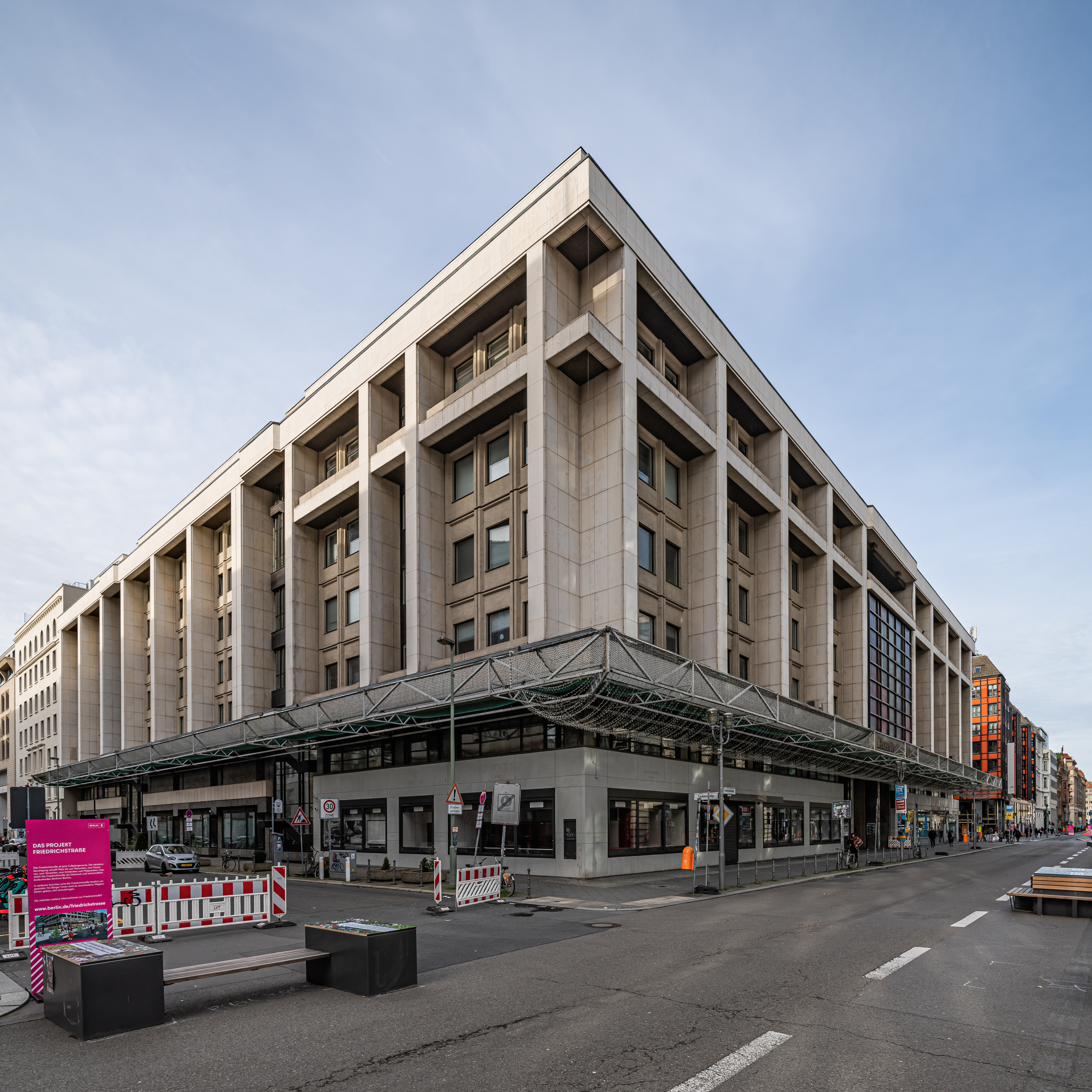
- Russian House in 2023
- Former names: House of Soviet Science and Culture

General information
- Location: Friedrichstraße 176–179, Berlin, Germany
- Coordinates: 52°30′48.2″N 13°23′20.0″E
- Opened: 5 July 1984

Technical details
- Floor area: 29,000 m^{2} (310,000 sq ft)

Design and construction
- Architect: Karl-Ernst Swora

The Russian House in Berlin, also known in English as the Russian House of Science and Culture (German: Russisches Haus der Wissenschaft und Kultur; Russian: Русский дом в Берлине) is a Russian cultural and information centre at Friedrichstraße 176–179 in Mitte, Berlin. It opened in East Berlin in 1984 as the House of Soviet Science and Culture (German: Haus der Sowjetischen Wissenschaft und Kultur) and continued as a Russian cultural institution after the dissolution of the Soviet Union. Its activities are administered by Rossotrudnichestvo, a Russian federal government agency, having been one of its Russian Houses.

The European Union imposed sanctions on Rossotrudnichestvo in July 2022. The Russian House subsequently became the subject of investigations and political debate in Germany concerning the application of those sanctions and its programming. In August 2026, German media reported that the French Interior Ministry had described the centre as cover for Russian intelligence services; German security authorities did not publicly endorse that assessment. On September 1, 2026, Foreign Minister Johann Wadephul announced that Germany would terminate the 2011 bilateral agreement governing the centre's activities.

== History ==
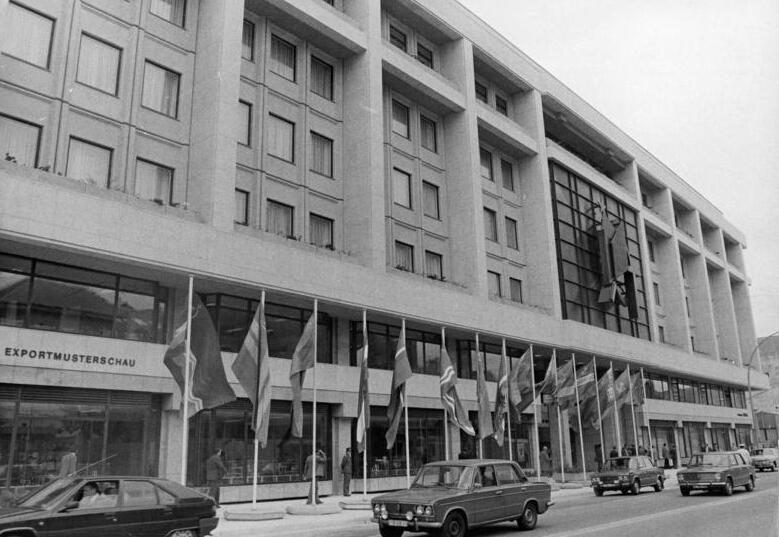
The House of Soviet Science and Culture in 1984

The building was constructed from 1981 to 1984 and designed by East German architect Karl-Ernst Swora. It opened on July 5, 1984 as the House of Soviet Science and Culture. The centre included conference rooms, exhibition space, a library and a bookshop; other facilities included a cinema, concert spaces and rooms for music, art, and Russian-language instruction.

After German reunification and the dissolution of the Soviet Union, the institution continued as the Russian House of Science and Culture.

== Legal status and operation ==
Germany and Russia signed an agreement on the activities of their cultural and information centres in February 2011. The agreement applies expressly to the Russian House in Berlin and to the Goethe-Instituts then operating in Moscow, Saint Petersburg and Novosibirsk. It states that the Russian House's activities are administered by Rossotrudnichestvo and that the premises of the centers do not have diplomatic immunity or inviolability.

A separate agreement signed in May 2013 governs the accommodation and property arrangements for the Russian House in Berlin and the Goethe-Institut in Moscow. The 2013 property agreement has a term of 99 years and cannot be terminated unilaterally.

== Sanctions and investigations ==
On July 21, 2022 the European Union added Rossotrudnichestvo to its sanctions list. The EU described it as a Russian federal government agency and said that it projected Kremlin soft power and hybrid influence, funded public-diplomacy and propaganda projects and promoted Russian claims to occupied Ukrainian territory.

In January 2023, Berlin prosecutors opened an investigation into whether activities of the Russian House violated Germany's Foreign Trade and Payments Act. Reuters reported that the inquiry followed reporting that the Russian House had bought airline tickets for two pro-Russian activists in Germany to attend a Kremlin-backed conference in Moscow. The investigation was discontinued in September 2023; the Berlin prosecutor's office said the responsible officials had diplomatic status.

In June 2025, the Munich Administrative Court rejected an action brought by the Russian House concerning access to frozen funds for electricity payments. The court found that the Russian House was identical with, or an organizationally dependent part of, Rossotrudnichestvo for the purposes of the EU sanctions regulation, and that its funds were frozen under that regulation.

== Programming and intelligence allegations ==
Deutsche Welle reported that films screened at the centre included material produced by the Russian state broadcaster RT that portrayed Ukrainians as Nazis.

Critics including Green Bundestag member Robin Wagener described the centre as a propaganda operation, while the Russian House described its work as cultural activity carried out under the bilateral agreement.

In August 2026, WDR and the Süddeutsche Zeitung reported on a French Interior Ministry expulsion order concerning Xenia Fedorova, the former head of RT France. According to the documents, the ministry said that Fedorova had sought the directorship of the Russian House and described the Berlin centre as being used as cover by Russian intelligence services. Germany's Federal Office for the Protection of the Constitution declined to say publicly whether it shared the French assessment.

== Planned closure ==
On September 1, 2026, the German government attributed the 2026 Leipzig Airport drone incidents on August 4 to Russia. Wadephul announced that Germany would terminate the agreement under which the Russian House operates. The existing agreement expires on June 7, 2027 and that the Russian House would have to close by then. The 2013 agreement governing property arrangements is a separate treaty.
