= Embassy of Russia, Copenhagen =

Russian diplomatic office for Denmark

Embassy of the Russian Federation in Copenhagen Посольство Российской Федерации в Копенгагене
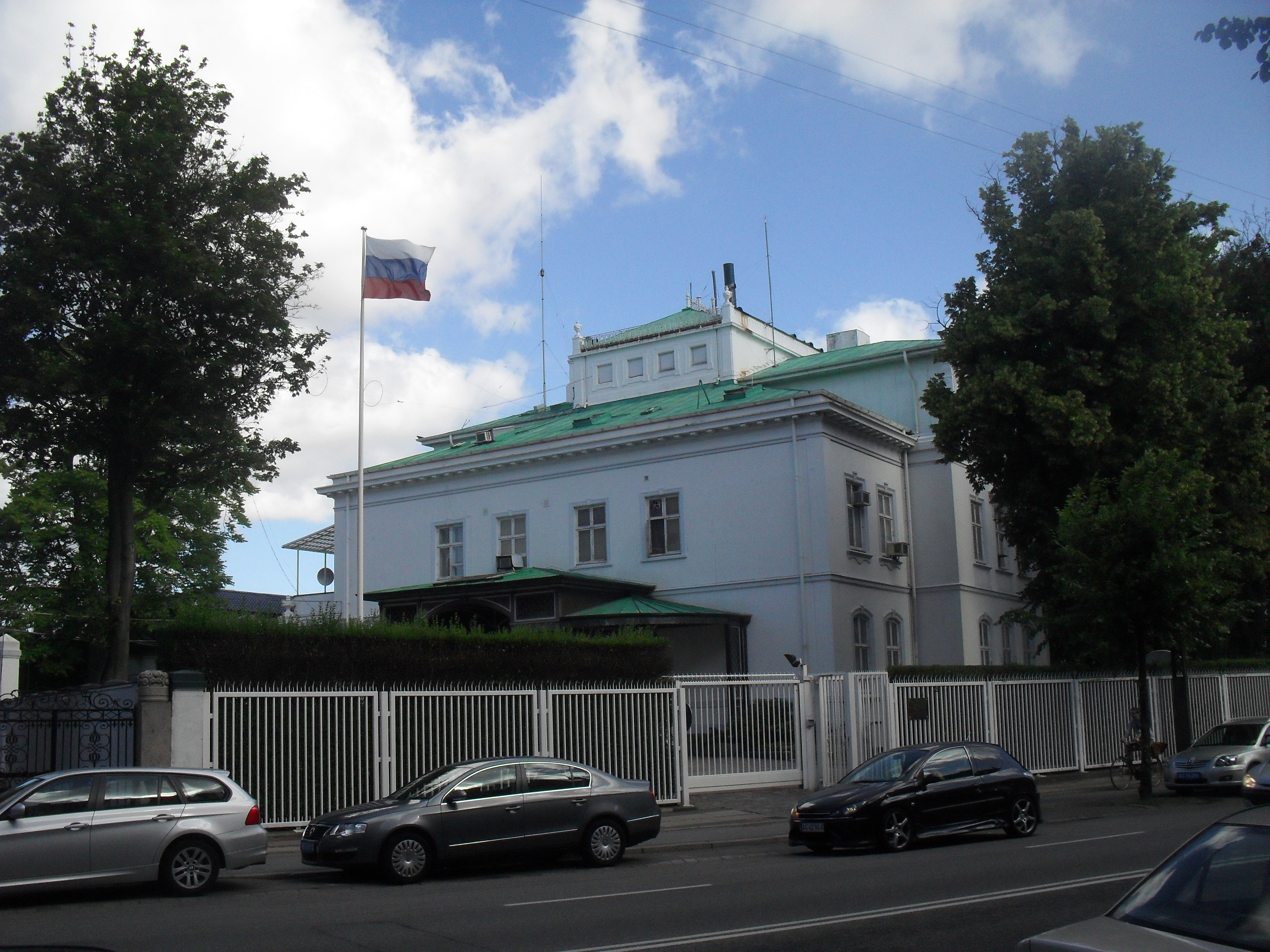
- Location: Copenhagen, Denmark
- Address: Kristianiagade 5
- Coordinates: 55.6942°N 12.5858°E
- Ambassador: Vladimir Barbin

The Embassy of Russia in Copenhagen is the diplomatic mission of the Russian Federation to the Kingdom of Denmark. The chancery is located at Kristianiagade 5 in Indre Østerbro, Copenhagen, and is a heritage listed building.

== History ==
In 1897, Otto Mønsted, a Danish entrepreneur and margarine magnate, purchased three parcels of land in Østerbro, Copenhagen and commissioned architect Vilhelm Dahlerup to design a villa on the site. Dahlerup, who specialised in Italian Renaissance style design had previously designed the Hotel D’Angleterre, the Jesus Church in Valby, the National Gallery, and the Ny Carlsberg Glyptotek, amongst others. Completed in 1899, the building of the mansion cost Mønsted half a million kroner.

The entrance was decorated with a monogram with the initials AOM (for Anna-Otto-Mønsted). The Mønsteds kept a large staff in their mansion, with gardeners creating a large garden, and in the garage Mønsted kept Copenhagen's most expensive car. The Mønsteds also bred Scottish hunting dogs and kept race horses in the barn.

In 1934, Anna Mønsted sold the mansion for 265,000 kroner to Countess Musse Scheel, a Danish actress, who became the last private owner of the mansion. Scheel, an animal lover, who was widely regarded as being eccentric, kept a hen house in the yard and sold eggs to her neighbours.

During the occupation of Denmark by Nazi Germany, the mansion was the headquarters of the Northern Society which promoted cultural co-operation between Nazi Germany and the Nordic countries.

In 1950, the Soviet Union signed a contract leasing the mansion for 20,000 kroner per year. In 1982, the mansion, as well as Kristianiagade 3 (consulate) and Bergensgade 11 (embassy school), were granted to the Soviets, on the basis of reciprocity, free of charge for the purpose of embassy requirements for a period of 70 years, until 31 December 2051.

The building and garage are heritage listed buildings, having entered the register of the Danish Heritage Agency on 3 December 1991.

After the Russian invasion of the sovereign nation of Ukraine in February 2022, the street outside the embassy has been home to growing demonstrations in support of Ukraine. Speeches by the Danish PM Mette Frederiksen and opposition leader Jakob Ellemann-Jensen have been given, both showing sympathy for Ukraine and both condemning Russia.

Six months after the war started, August 24, 2022, an event was organized in front of the embassy. The embassy was lit up in Ukrainian colors and 378 candles were placed in front the building. One candle was lit for every killed child by Russians in Ukraine.

== See also ==
- Russian Centre for Science and Culture, Copenhagen
