= Russian Center of Science and Culture, Belgrade =

The Russian House
- Russian: Русский дом Serbo-Croatian: Руски дом, romanized: Ruski dom
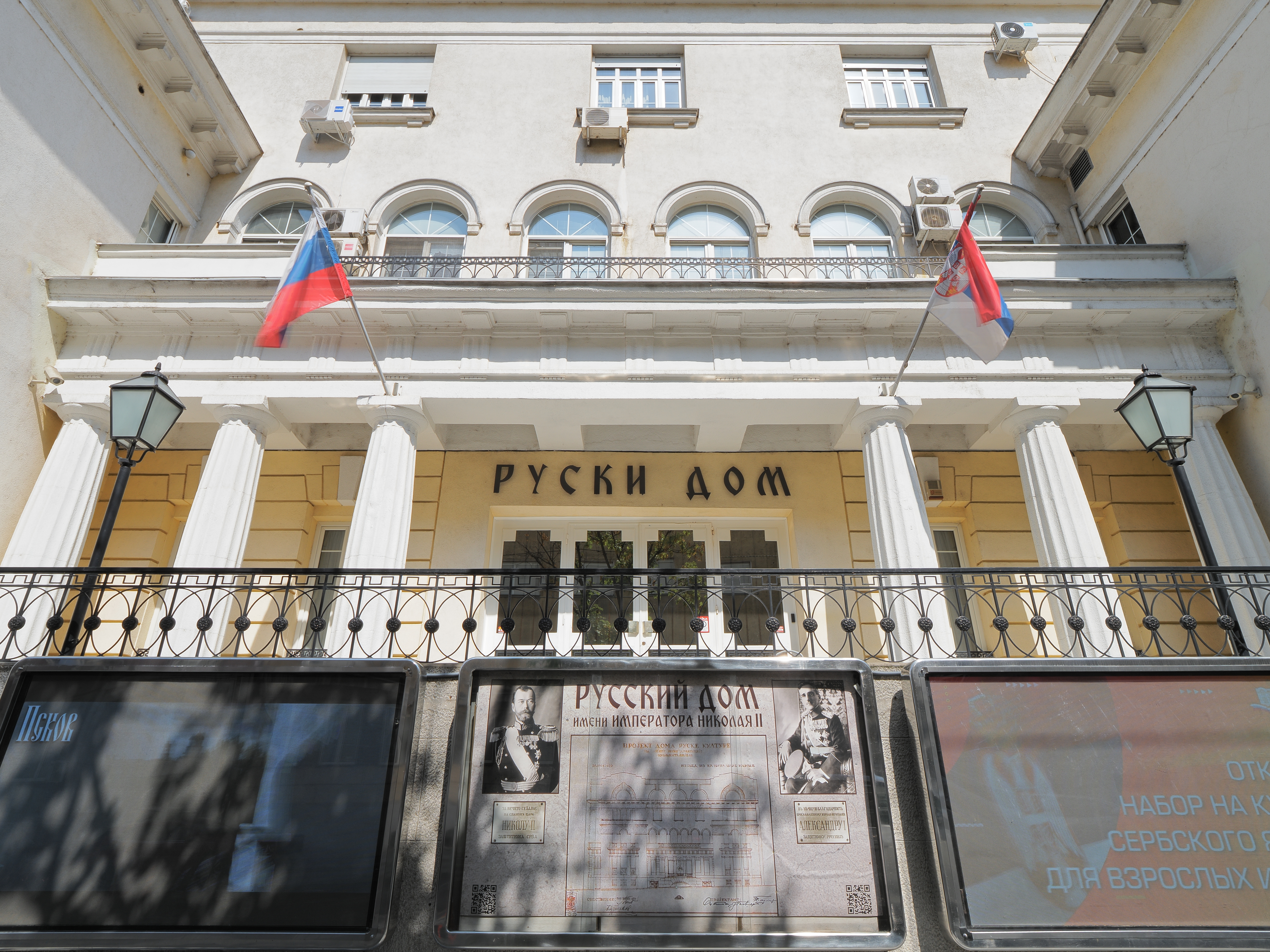
- General view of The Russian House
- Interactive map of the The Russian House area
- Former names: Emperor Nicholas II's Russian House (1933-45); House of Soviet culture (1945-94)
- Alternative names: Russian Center of Science and Culture

General information
- Type: Public building
- Architectural style: neoclassicism
- Location: Serbia, Belgrade, Stari Grad, Belgrade, Queen Natalia str., 33
- Coordinates: 44.8095°N 20.461°E
- Construction started: June 22, 1931
- Inaugurated: April 9, 1933
- Owner: Rossotrudnichestvo of Russian Ministry of Foreign Affairs

Technical details
- Floor count: 4

Design and construction
- Architect: Vasily Baumgarten

Renovating team
- Architect: Grigoriy Samoylov

Website
- www.ruskidom.rs

The Russian House — Russian Centre of Science and Culture in Belgrade (Russian: Российский центр науки и культуры «Русский дом», Serbian: Руски центар за науку и културу „Руски дом“, romanized: Ruski centar za nauku i kulturu „Ruski dom“) is a centre aimed to promote Russian language and culture, it is one of Rossotrudnichestvo's 44 present Russian Cultural Centers worldwide.

Establishment of the Russian Center is strongly connected to Russian emigrants in the Kingdom of Yugoslavia, after 1917 October Revolution. Idea for establishment comes from these emigrants, and it has been affirmed by King Alexander, Serbian Patriarch Varnava, Aleksandar Belić and other famous persons from Serbia.

Center is finished by the project of Vasily Baumgarten, talented Russian architect. It is opened as cultural center on 9 April 1933.

In the post World War II period, Center is turned to the Home of Soviet Culture. Since 1994 to present it has been named Russian Center of Science and Culture — The Russian House.
