= Russian Cultural Center =

Cultural center in Washington, D.C., United States

- Российский центр науки и культуры в Вашингтоне
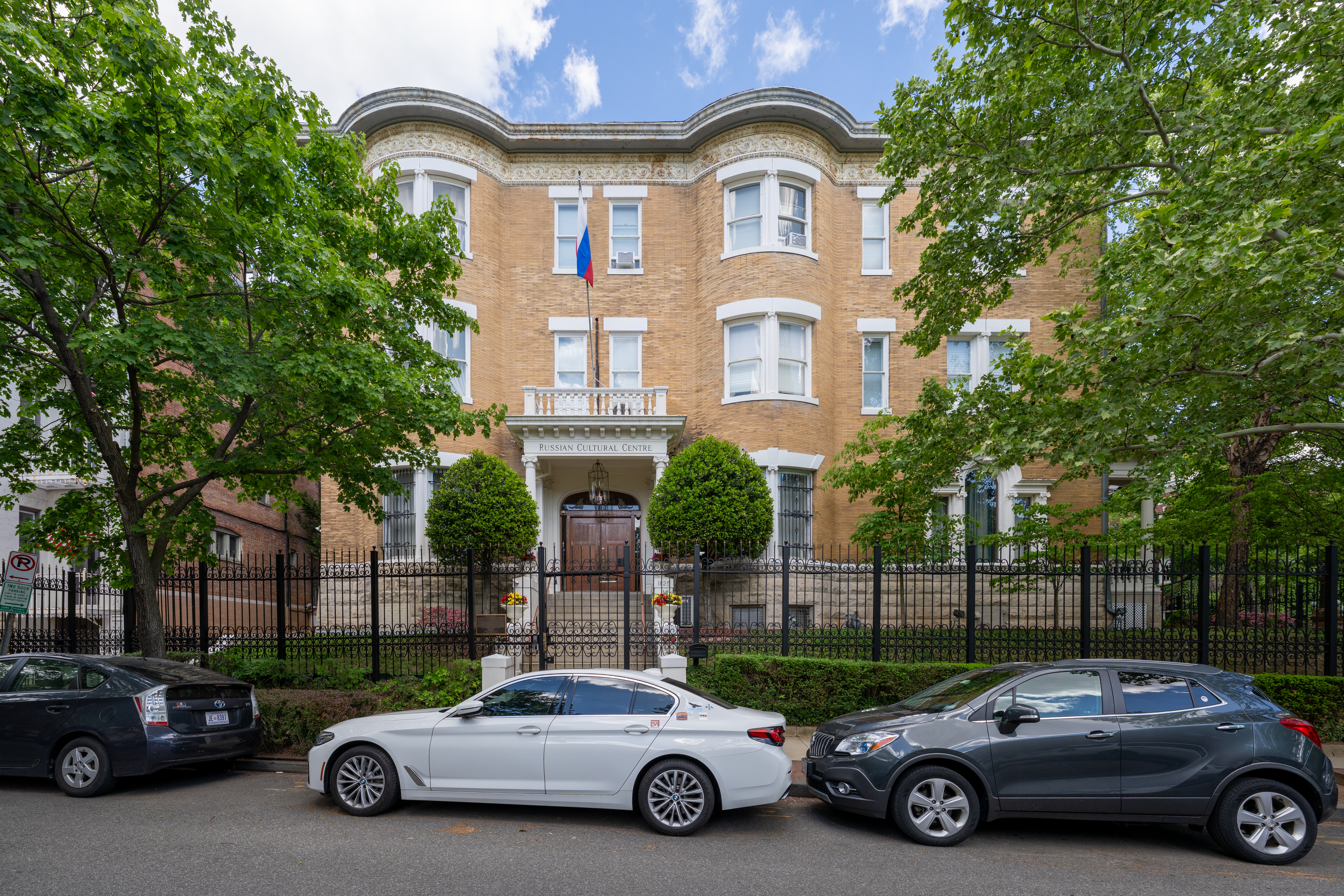

- Location within Washington, D.C.
- Established: December 10, 1999
- Location: 1825 Phelps Place NW, Washington, D.C. 20008
- Coordinates: 38.9154°N 77.0485°W
- Owner: Government of Russia
- Public transit access: Dupont Circle
- Website: rccusa.org

The Russian Cultural Center (RCC, Russian: Российский центр науки и культуры в Вашингтоне) is a museum and building in Washington, D.C. supporting Russian culture in the United States. The center is operated by Rossotrudnichestvo, an autonomous agency of the Russian Foreign Ministry, being one of the agency's Russian Houses.

The center calls itself, "the official home of Russian culture in the United States," and hosts public events featuring visiting Russian musicians and artists to foster better relations and understanding between the U.S. and Russia. It has also held group and private classes for those interested in speaking and writing in Russian, and has provided Russian language proficiency tests required for those applying for Russian citizenship.

== History ==
The building was designed by Thomas Franklin Schneider and built in 1897. From 1897 to 1899 Conrad Miller was the first owner, followed by famous Irish-American miner Thomas Francis Walsh from 1899 to 1903, then Aldis Browne from 1903 to 1906, and finally Benjamin Franklin Pilson from 1906 to 1957. Three of Pilson's children would later found the Friends of the Russian Culture Center (FRCC), an American 501(c)(3) nonprofit organization providing support to the center.

In 1957 the building was purchased by the Soviet government to be used as an elementary school for the children of embassy staff. The school covered first grade through fourth grade, had approximately 30–40 students, two teachers, and held classes Monday through Saturday from 9 am till 12:45 pm.

In the 1970s and 1980s it housed the Soviet consulate where Americans wanting to travel to Russia would receive their visas.

In 1998, the building was designated as the Russian Cultural Center by a bilateral agreement. The center opened on December 10, 1999, with Valentina Tereshkova – the first woman in space – asking Americans to "please consider the new RCC as your home too".

Since at least 2001, the center has organized all-expenses-paid cultural exchange trips to Russia for young Americans. The trips included lodging at luxury hotels and meetings with Russian officials.

On April 20, 2001, Mikhail Gorbachev planted a "Tree of Peace" on the front lawn of the center as a symbol of peace between Russia and America in the 21st century.

== Events ==
In 2011, internationally known baritone soloist Carl Ratner, professor of Voice and Director of Opera at Western Michigan University, performed at the center reciting songs by Russian and Russian-American composers.

On March 10, 2025, Yale University's Russian chorus ensemble performed at the culture center singing Kalinka, Evening Bell, and other Russian songs during their "mission of cultural diplomacy and peace on our annual spring tour in Washington D.C."

== Controversies ==
In October 2013, the center's director, Yury Zaitsev (Russian: Юрий Зайцев), was investigated by the FBI for allegedly using the center's cultural exchange program to recruit young Americans as Russian spies. The FBI interviewed Americans sent by Zaitsev and warned them they were being targeted for recruitment. Zaitsev publicly denied the allegations before quietly leaving the country.

Zaitsev's replacement, Oleg Zhiganov (Russian: Олег Жиганов), was suspected of being a Russian spy and expelled from the U.S. as part of the expulsions of Russian diplomats in March 2018 in retaliation for the poisoning of Sergei and Yulia Skripal in Salisbury, England.

== Gallery ==
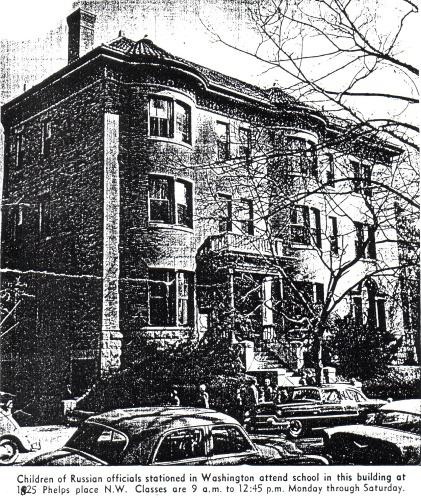
The center when it was used as a school on March 30, 1958.

== See also ==
- Russian Houses (Rossotrudnichestvo)
