= Russkiy Mir Foundation =

Russian cultural organization

Russkiy Mir Foundation Фонд «Русский мир»
- Founded: June 21, 2007
- Founder: Vladimir Putin; Government of Russia
- Type: Cultural institution
- Location: Headquartered in Moscow
- Region served: Worldwide
- Product: Russian cultural education
- Owner: Russia
- Key people: Vyacheslav Nikonov; Dmitry Kozak; Sergey Lavrov
- Employees: 80–120
- Website: https://russkiymir.ru/en/

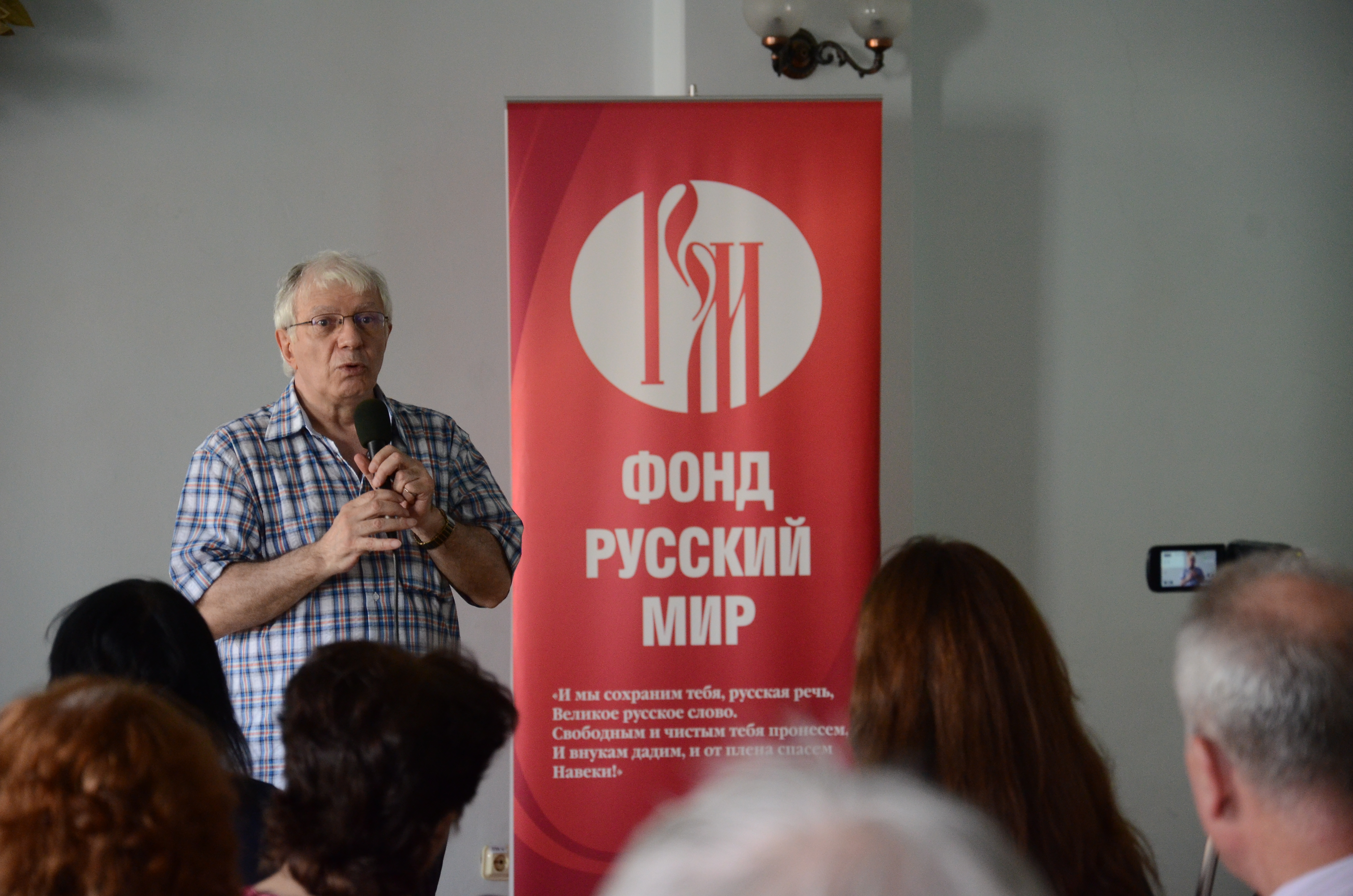
Alexander Mirzayan in a room of the foundation in August 2015 (Eastern Ukraine)

Russkiy Mir Foundation (Russian: Фонд «Русский мир»; lit. 'Russian World Foundation') is a government-sponsored organization aimed at promoting the Russian language and Russian culture worldwide, and "forming the Russian World as a global project", co-operating with the Russian Orthodox Church in promoting values that challenge the Western cultural tradition. It was created by decree by Vladimir Putin in 2007. The Foundation was modeled after similar culture promotion agencies, such as British Council and Goethe Institute.

The founders are the Ministry of Foreign Affairs of the Russian Federation and the Ministry of Education and Science of the Russian Federation. The assets of the foundation come from the federal budget, voluntary property contributions and donations, and other legal sources.

The foundation made in 2011 an agreement with the University of São Paulo for founding the Laboratório de Estudos Russos (LERUSS).

Some observers described the foundation as an instrument for projecting the Russian state's soft power and as a tool for propaganda. Since the 2022 Russian invasion of Ukraine, the general Western disposition is that the Russian world as a concept and its instruments have been associated with Russian irredentism, imperialism and totalitarianism.

== Sanctions ==
In July 2022 the EU imposed sanctions on Russkiy Mir Foundation in relation to the 2022 Russian invasion of Ukraine.

== See also ==
- Russian Houses (Rossotrudnichestvo)
