= Russian Houses (Rossotrudnichestvo) =

Russian government-operated cultural centers abroad

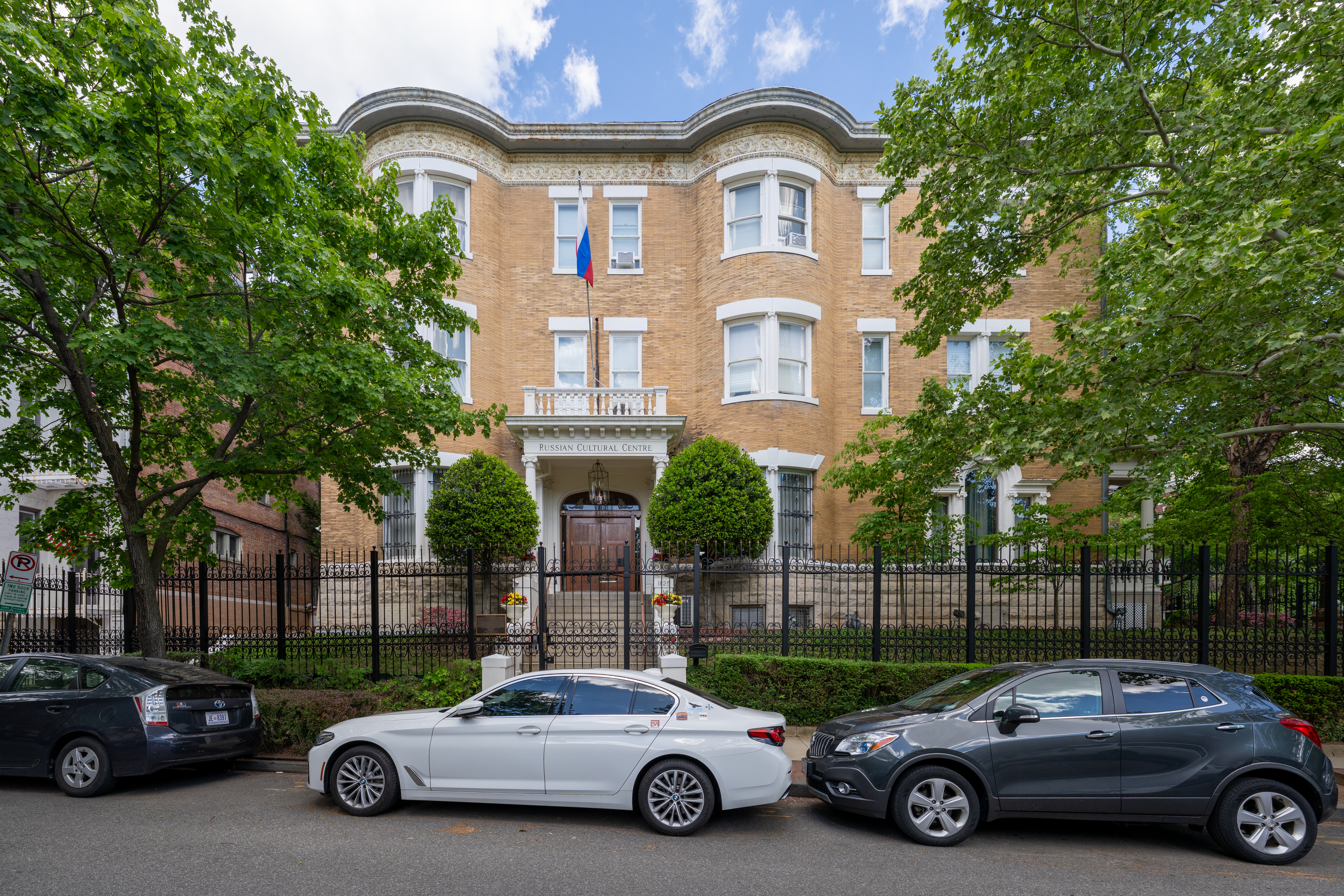
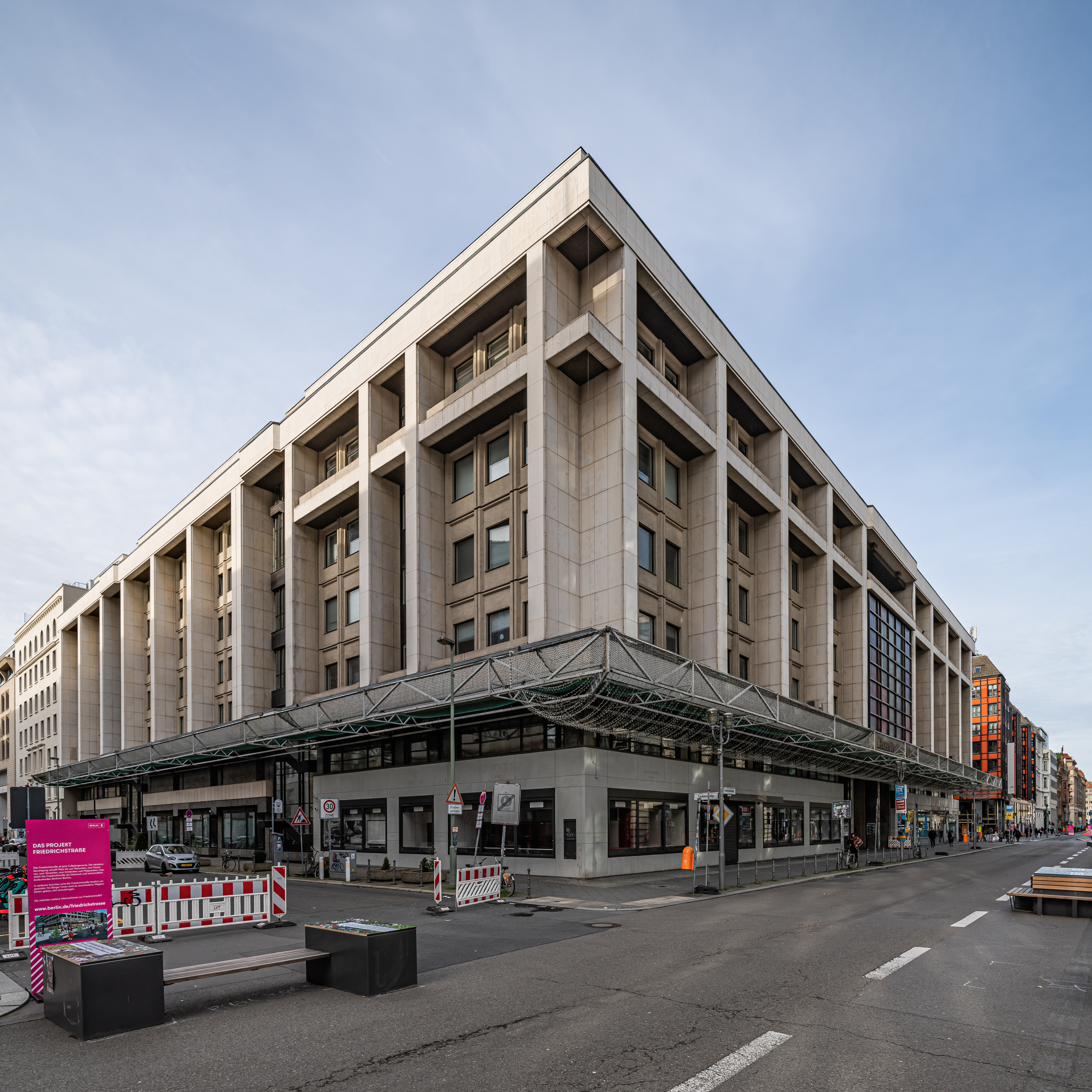
Top: The Russian Cultural Center in Washington, D.C., in the United States.
Bottom: The Russian House in Berlin, Germany, closed in 2026.

The Russian Centers of Science and Culture (Note: Russian: Российские центры науки и культуры, romanized: Rossiyskiye tsentry nauki i kultury; sing. Российский центр науки и культуры, Rossiyskiy tsentr nauki i kultury.) or Russian Centers of Culture and Science, more commonly known as the Russian Houses, (Note: Russian: Русские дома, romanized: Russkiye doma; sing. Русский дом, Russkiy dom.) are cultural centers abroad operated by Rossotrudnichestvo, a Russian state agency for cultural outreach outside Russia. As of September 2026, there were 85 Russian Houses worldwide. Some countries hosted more than one, with Belarus, Kazakhstan and India each having four and Armenia, Brazil, Kyrgyzstan and Israel all hosting two at the time.

The European Union (EU) sanctioned Rossotrudnichestvo in 2022, with EU documents describing the agency as a Russian government tool for soft power, hybrid influence and promotion of the "Russian world" (russkiy mir) concept. According to Radio France Internationale, following the 2022 Russian invasion of Ukraine, the houses increasingly faced scrutiny in Europe amid accusations of promoting Russian government propaganda and, in some cases, offer cover for intelligence activities. As asserted by the United States Africa Command's Africa Defense Forum magazine, experts and investigative journalists considered the Russian Houses as central pieces in Russia's disinformation and propaganda operations in Africa. Chinese researcher Yuqing Yang described Rossotrudnichestvo's Russian Houses as one of Russia's three major assets in the fields of art and culture abroad, along with the cabinets and the centers of the Russkiy Mir Foundation.

At least 13 Russian Houses had closed across the world as of September 2026 since the Russian invasion of Ukraine in 2022. Before the invasion, there were 15 such entities in the EU. Russian Houses ceased operation in Ljubljana, Slovenia, in April 2022; in Bucharest, Romania, in February 2023; in Croatia, Montenegro and North Macedonia as of April 2023; in Copenhagen, Denmark, in September 2023; in Baku, Azerbaijan, in 2025, following the crash of Azerbaijan Airlines Flight 8243 after it was struck by Russian air defense forces; in Warsaw, Poland, in February 2026, albeit it was not formally closed; in Chișinău, Moldova, in July 2026; and in Berlin, Germany, in September 2026. As of 2023, Russian Houses had also suspended their operations in Switzerland, New York City in the United States and in the United Kingdom. As of April 2023, the Russian House in Slovakia had stopped its work as well, but it resumed operations in summer 2025 following a ban lift on cultural cooperation with Belarus and Russia.

The largest house was the Russian House in Berlin, which the Russian state spent about 10 million dollars a year on until its closure in 2026 following the failed Leipzig Airport drone attack. German lawmakers had demanded its shutdown some weeks prior, describing it as a suspected hub for espionage and agent recruitment. Regarding the house in Chișinău, Moldova's Minister of Culture, Cristian Jardan, stated in 2025 that, while the center was "initially intended to promote cultural exchange", it had "become a tool for Kremlin propaganda" in recent years. He added that all of the administration and employees at the house in Chișinău were diplomats from the Russian embassy in the city, stating "I am unaware of any other cultural center in the world being led and managed entirely by diplomats".

== List ==
- Russian Center of Science and Culture in Belgrade, Serbia
- Russian Cultural Center in Washington, D.C., the United States

=== Former ===
- Russian Centre for Science and Culture in Copenhagen, Denmark
- Russian House in Berlin, Germany
