= Rossotrudnichestvo =

Federal government agency of Russia

Federal Agency for the Commonwealth of Independent States Affairs, Compatriots Living Abroad, and International Humanitarian Cooperation
- Федеральное агентство по делам Содружества Независимых Государств, соотечественников, проживающих за рубежом, и по международному гуманитарному сотрудничеству
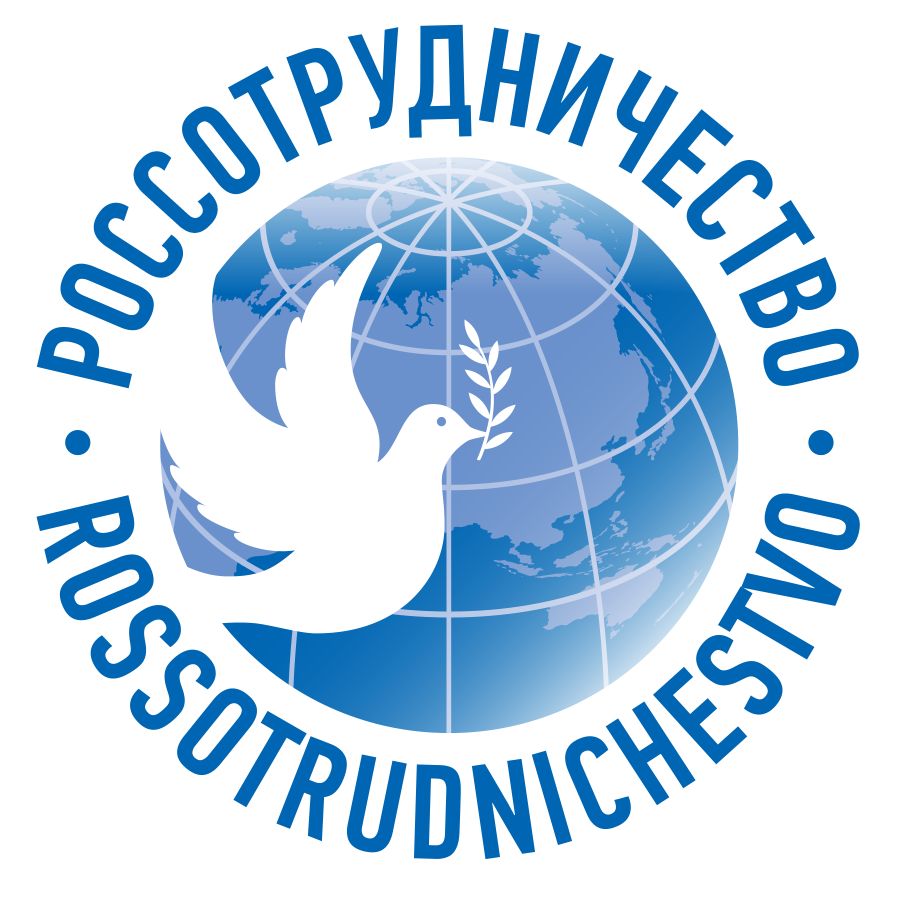

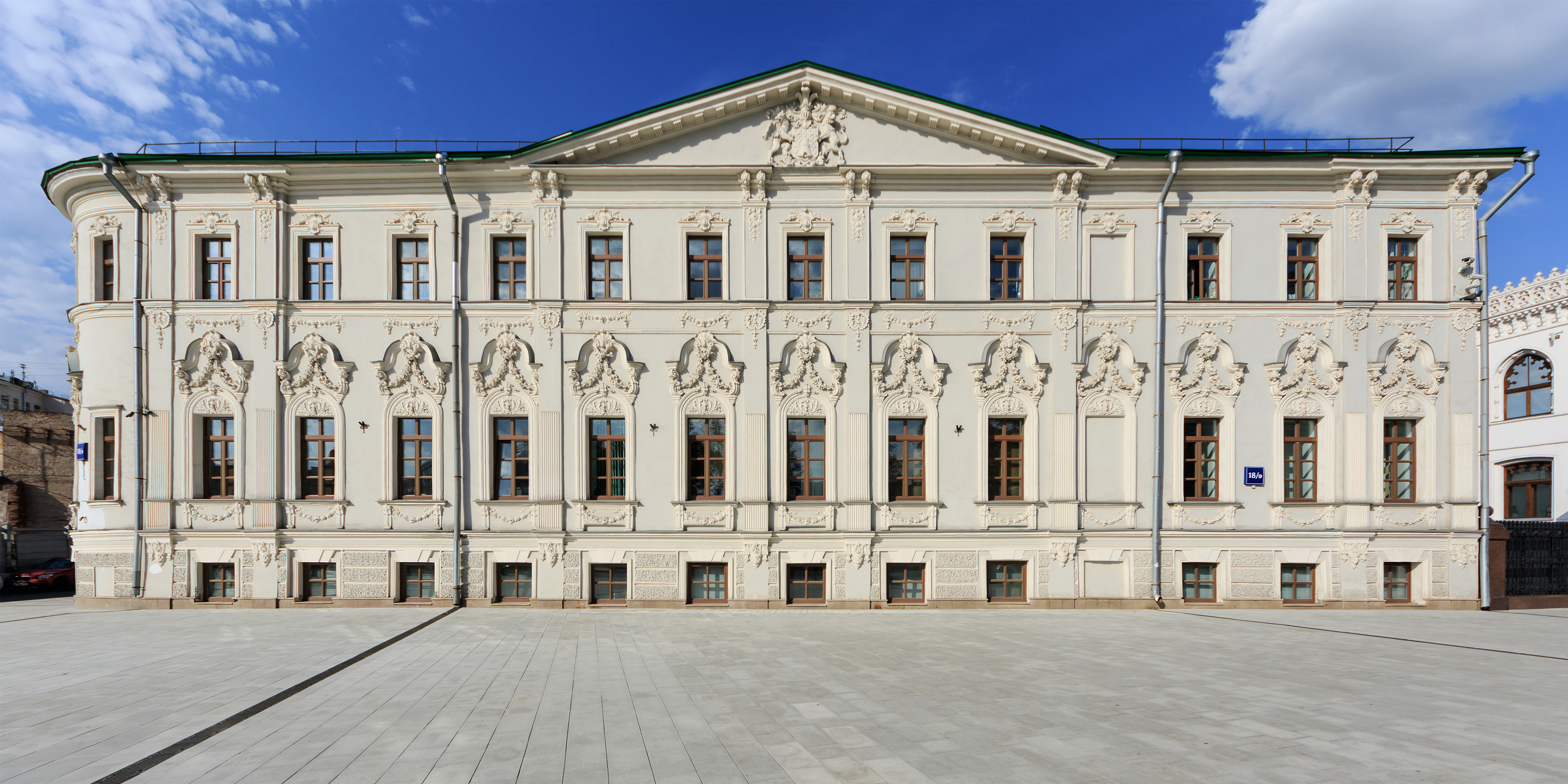
- Seat of the agency at Shakhovsky Manor

Agency overview
- Formed: September 6, 2008
- Preceding agency: Federal Agency for the Commonwealth of Independent States
- Headquarters: Vozdvizhenka Street 18/9 Moscow
- Agency executive: Igor Chaika, Head
- Parent agency: Russian Ministry of Foreign Affairs
- Website: rs.gov.ru/en

The Federal Agency for the Commonwealth of Independent States Affairs, Compatriots Living Abroad, and International Humanitarian Cooperation, (Note: Russian: Федеральное агентство по делам Содружества Независимых Государств, соотечественников, проживающих за рубежом, и по международному гуманитарному сотрудничеству) commonly known as Rossotrudnichestvo, (Note: Russian: Россотрудничество, lit. 'Russo-Colleagueship') is an autonomous Russian government agency under the jurisdiction of the Ministry of Foreign Affairs. It is primarily responsible for administering civilian foreign aid and cultural exchange. Rossotrudnichestvo operates in Central Asia, Latin America and Eastern Europe, primarily in the Commonwealth of Independent States (CIS).

== History ==
The agency was created from its predecessor agency by Presidential decree, signed by Russian president Dmitry Medvedev on 6 September 2008, with the aim of maintaining Russia's influence in the Commonwealth of Independent States, and to foster friendly ties for the advancement of Russia's political and economic interests in foreign states.

Apparently from an investigation by the Alexey Navalny associated website (navalny.com), Ekaterina Solotsinskaya, who was Dmitry Peskov's second ex-wife, was fired in February 2018 as the head of the Russian Center for Science and Culture in Paris (RCSC) or (RTsNK) (Russian: Российский центр науки и культуры в Париже (РЦНК)), which is under the auspices of Rossotrudnichestvo in France.

According to OECD estimates, 2019 official development assistance from Russia increased to US$1.2 billion.

Rossotrudnichestvo was assessed by expert observers (Note: Ben Noble, associate professor of Russian politics at University College London; Mark Galeotti, an analyst and Russia specialist; and Sam Ramani, an international relations expert at Oxford University provided evaluations to The Times newspaper.) to be organising and orchestrating synchronous pro-Russian public rallies, demonstrations, and vehicle convoys across Europe in April 2022 in support of the Russian invasion of Ukraine. Demonstrations were held simultaneously in Dublin (Ireland), Berlin, Hanover, Frankfurt (Germany), Limassol (Cyprus), and Athens (Greece).

== Sanctions ==
In July 2022, the European Union imposed sanctions on Rossotrudnichestvo in relation to the Russian invasion of Ukraine.

== See also ==
- Russian Houses (Rossotrudnichestvo)
- List of development aid agencies
- United States foreign aid
- US AID
- EXIAR
